= Burmese folk religion =

Religious traditions of Burmese people according to legends

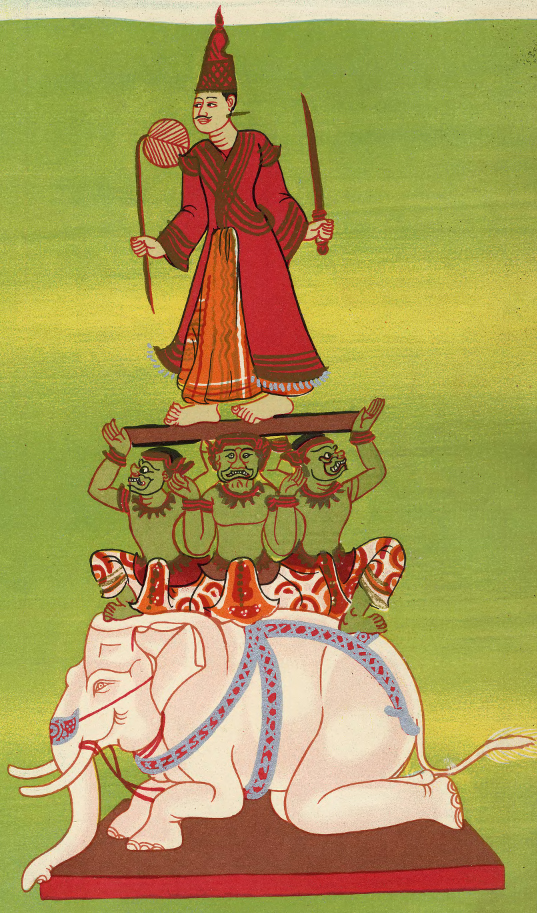
Nat Mahagiri.

Burmese folk religion (also known as Nat Worship by locals) refers to the animistic and polytheistic religious worship of nats (deities of local and Hindu origin) and ancestors in Myanmar (Burma). The beliefs of nats differ across different regions and villages in Burma. A nat is a god-like spirit. There are two main types of nats: nat sein (နတ်စိမ်း), which are humans who were deified after their deaths, and all the other nats, which are spirits of nature (spirits of water, trees, etc).

Nats are usually venerated in shrines called nat kun (နတ်ကွန်း) or nat sin (နတ်စင်). They can be placed anywhere to honor nature spirits (spirit houses) or they may be specialized shrines for particular nats. A village will traditionally also have a spirit which is their local patron; this is called a Bo Bo Gyi.

== History and origins ==
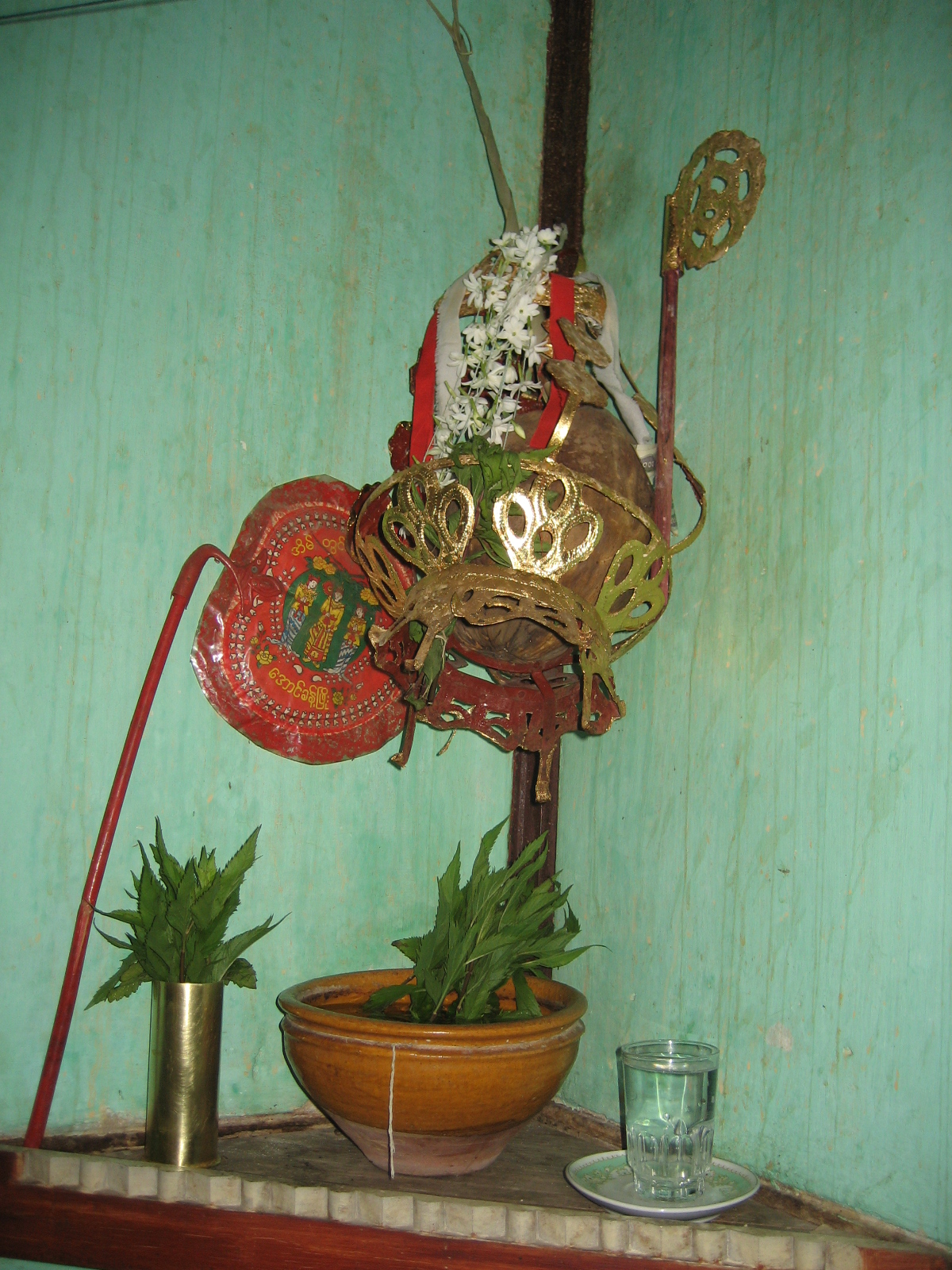
Coconut, as a symbol for the nat hung on a post in a house.

The precise origins of Burmese folk faith and nat worship are not definitively known. However, at the time King Anawrahta (1044–1077) was ruling, nat worship was rampant. He became frustrated with this widespread worship of nats and tried to eliminate them. The people continued to worship the nats, and so the king ordered the destruction of all statues and images of nats. Despite this, people still worshipped them by using a coconut as a symbol for them. Now in place of a typical nat statue, there sat a coconut, which served as an offering to the nat, as well as a symbol for the nat itself

The king came to the realisation that he could not possibly stop these nats from being worshipped, so he created a formal list of 37, strategically renaming the head one, Thagyamin- the Burmese version of the Hindu god Indra. He also placed statues of deva in front of the nats. This symbolised the preference for practising Buddhism over folk faith. Many figures related to Anawrahta became nats, adding an indigenous element to the pantheon.

Around the 17th century, we have our earliest full lists of the official pantheon of Thirty Seven Nats. They varied in specifics with the modern list originating from Myawaddy Mingyi U Sa's 1766 list.

Nat worship in the modern era has retained elements of animism and Hindu religious practices from before Buddhism's arrival in Burma. Thagyamin is a parallel to Indra and the average Buddhist practitioner in 20th century Burma mostly followed animist beliefs, with Buddhism forming a philosophical framework for nat worship. Nat shrines were in almost every Buddhist pagoda and monasteries offered cloths to the nats. The 19th century king Mindon Min attempted to push orthodox Buddhism and remove Thagyamin from the official pantheon. However, he failed to suppress nat worship beyond his own reign. Historically, nat worship involved a significant element of fear, worshipping or providing offerings to the nats to protect oneself from misfortune.

A testament to the continued survival of Burmese folk religion can be seen by the fact that the prime minister of Burma in the mid 20th century, U Nu, erected a nat-sin (nat shrine) as well as a traditional Buddhist shrine. This toleration of the nats continued through the socialist regime (1962–1968).

== Nat-kadaw and nat-pwe ==
=== Nat-kadaw ===
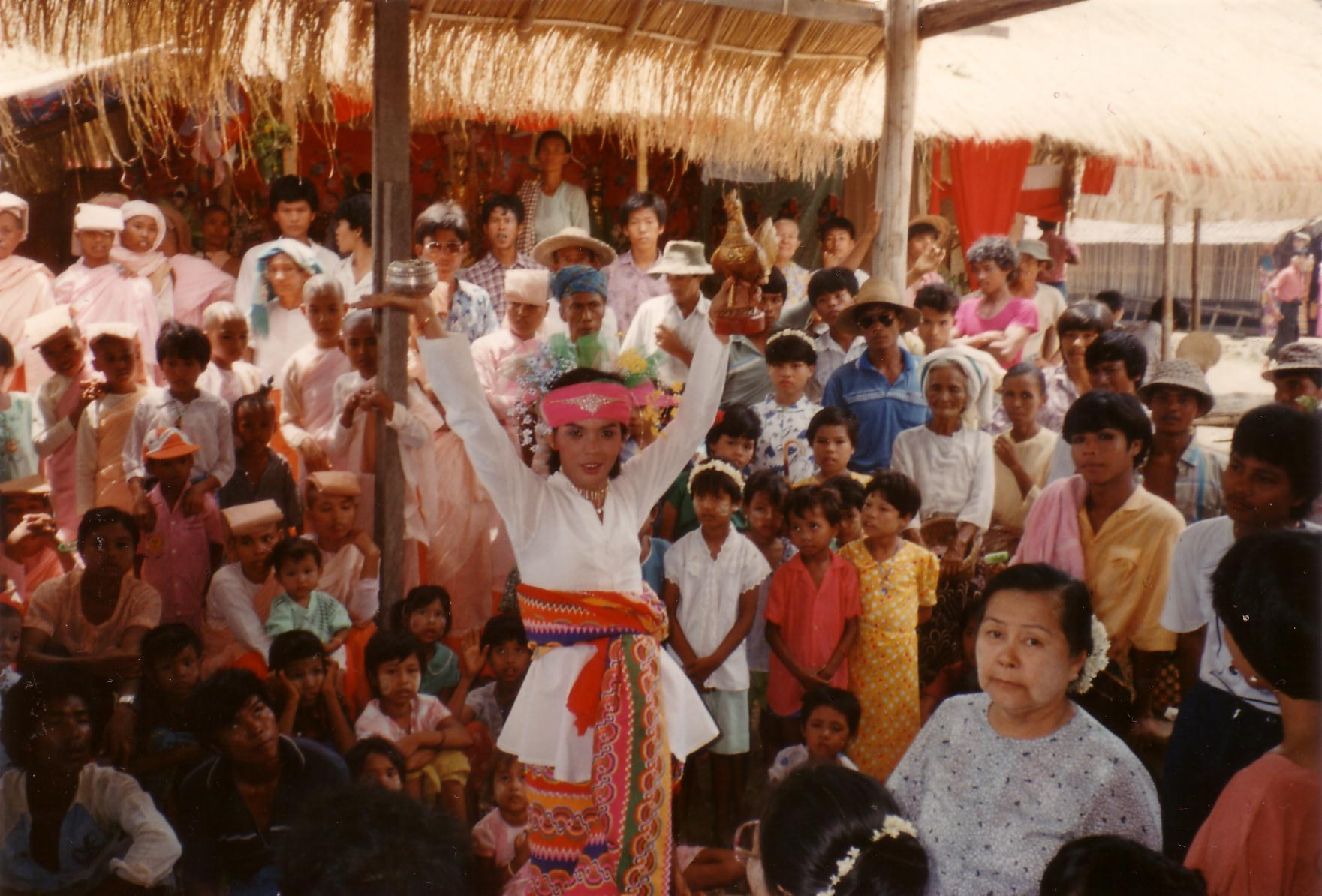
A nat-kadaw leading a festival.

Every village has someone who is a nat-kadaw. This person is seen as the master of ceremonies regarding nats, a type of shaman. The nat-kadaw has the special power to be able to be possessed by nats. Once possessed, their voice changes and they perform elaborate dances. This profession is somewhat frowned upon because it is centred on frivolity and letting go of restraints. Although it does not have the best reputation as a profession, it is an extremely profitable one. Oftentimes, when offerings are given to the nats, they are given directly to the nat-kadaw, who is said to be possessed by a nat. Throughout a festival the nat-kadaw will often ask for money. Although some of this money is given to the accompanying orchestra at a festival, the nat-kadaw also keeps some of this money.

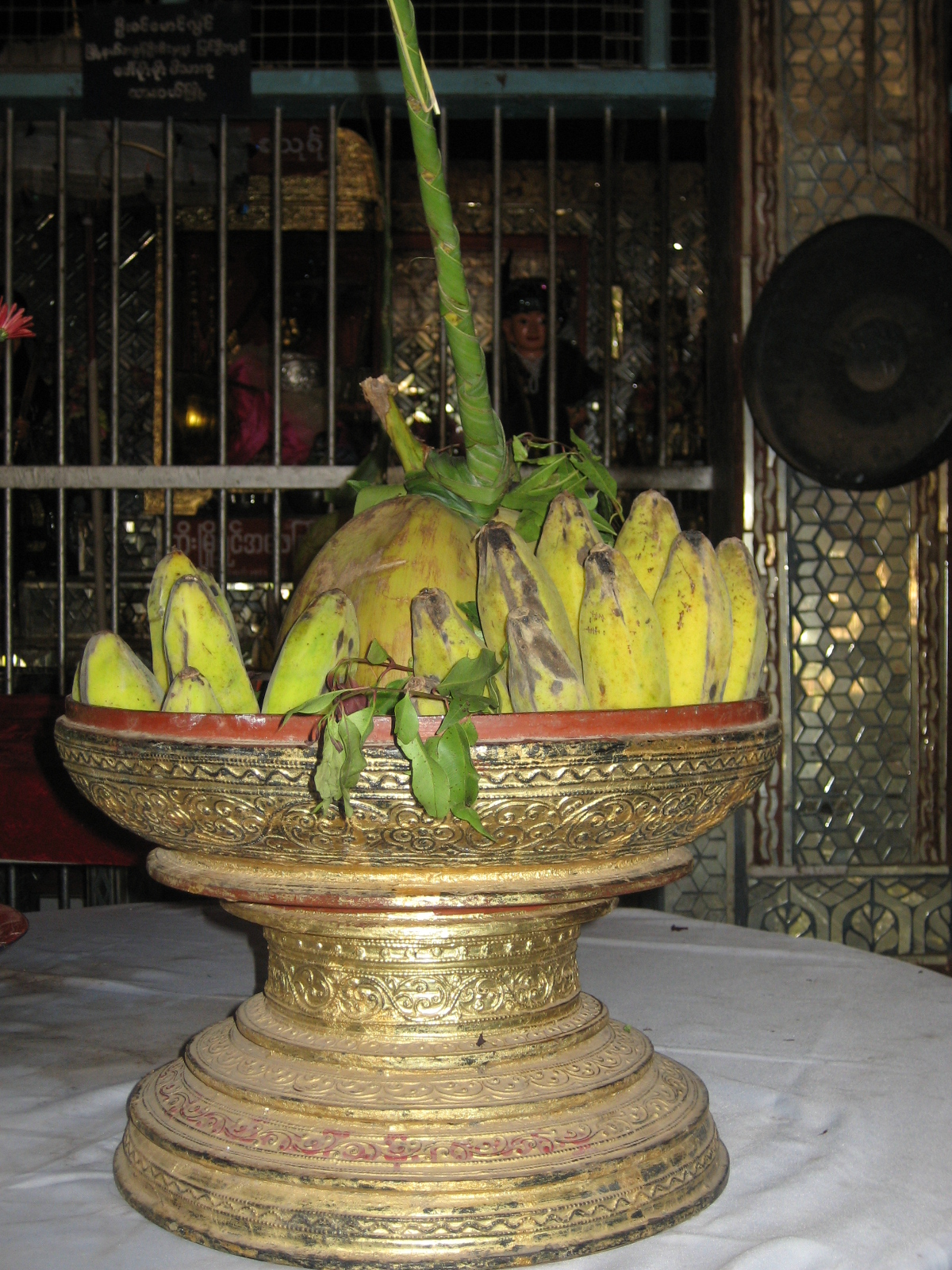
An offering one might see at a nat pwe.

Although this profession is seen as a frivolous one, nat-kadaws are in fact very religious. They still follow and uphold the precepts of Buddhism (Five Precepts), while simultaneously interacting closely with these nats. Oftentimes, a nat-kadaw can become tormented by a specific nat. Even if they already have a human husband or wife, they decide that they must marry this nat, for only then will they be at peace, and the torment that this nat is causing them will finally cease. The marriage of a nat and a nat-kadaw is done through an extremely elaborate ceremony titled Ley-Bya-Taik. In this ceremony, the nat-kadaw identifies the particular nat that they would like to marry, and then surrenders to it. In this process, mirrors are used to trap the soul (mentioned earlier) that leaves the host. Once this soul has left, the nat takes its place. After this transformation is complete, the nat-kadaw dances, embracing their recent marriage with a nat.

=== Nat-pwe ===
As mentioned earlier, these nat-kadaws are central in every nat-festival or nat-pwe. They often lead festivals, called nat-pwes, which are devoted to interacting with the nats. These nat-pwes are held at specific times of the year, or if there is a special occasion. They follow a similar structure and sequence of events. They always include an orchestra and much dancing. The first step in these festivals is the donation of many offerings, usually consisting of a coconut, bananas, fruits, leaves and rice. These offerings are prepared to eventually summon the nats to the ceremony. This practice of summoning is done by the nat-kadaw. Once the nats are summoned, a feast is had with them. After this, there is a farewell ceremony, and everyone bids the nats goodbye.

== Relationship with Buddhism ==
Today, Burmese folk religion and Buddhism are very closely tied to each other. Oftentimes, it is common to see a Buddhist offering and a nat-sin (or nat shrine) besides it. In Myanmar, there are varying degrees of reliance on nats versus Buddhist doctrine. The beliefs and practices of folk faith vary widely across Myanmar, so it is difficult to define this religion exactly. Several scholars in the 19th and 20th centuries have done field research in villages in Myanmar; their findings have then been reported by themselves, as well as recently by others in various books and articles. Although it is difficult to determine what the precise beliefs and practices are, these anthropologists found several common trends that help give a better picture of Burmese folk religion. In many instances, folk faith was practised directly alongside Buddhism. It wasn't uncommon to see families who had both Buddhist shrines and nat shrines in their own homes. There were also plenty of Buddhist monks, who simultaneously believed in the nats. Several quotes from various scholars in Myanmar exemplify the relationship between Buddhism and nat worship.

"The Buddhism of the people forms little or no part of their daily life,” and that although every Burman as a boy must go to a monastic school and wear the yellow robe, in his everyday life, from the day of his birth to his marriage, and even when he lies on his death bed, all the rites and forms that he observes are to be traced to folk religious and not to Buddhist sources. If calamity overtakes him he considers it to be the work of his nats, and when he wishes to commence any important undertaking, he propitiates these nats, who are the direct representatives of the old folk worship. Even the pongyi [monks] themselves are often directly influenced by the strong under-current of Burmese folk religion which underlies their faith in Buddhism”- Bishop Bigandet

“They [monks] are often the most expert tattooers and astrologers and fortune tellers. The Burman has much more faith in the ascertaining of lucky and unlucky days and in the deductions from his horoscope than in the virtue of alms and the efficacy of worship at the Pagoda.”

"As a simple matter of fact, it is undeniable that the propitiating of the nats is a question of daily concern to the lower-class Burman, while the worship at the pagoda is only thought of once a week.”-Richard Carnac Temple

The veneration of nats also shares similar practices with Buddhism. In Buddhism, offerings are extremely common and expected. Shrines and temples, in which these offerings are to be made, are seen in both Burmese folk religion and Buddhism. In both faiths, many different statues of various deities can also be seen around the house. Burmese folk religion differs dramatically in the concept of a soul. Buddhism does not believe in a soul that leaves after one dies, but rather a consciousness that is transferred to a new person (consciousness is reborn in another). In contrast, Burmese folk religion holds that the soul can leave the body it inhabits. This soul is often depicted in the form of a butterfly called a leippya (လိပ်ပြာ). The act of the soul leaving the host often happens in dreams, or when someone is sick or dying. If one is awakened in the middle of their dream, it is said that their soul might not be back to them yet. If a host tries to live without its soul it will die. When someone is dying, butterfly hunts are often held to try to recapture the soul that has wandered off.

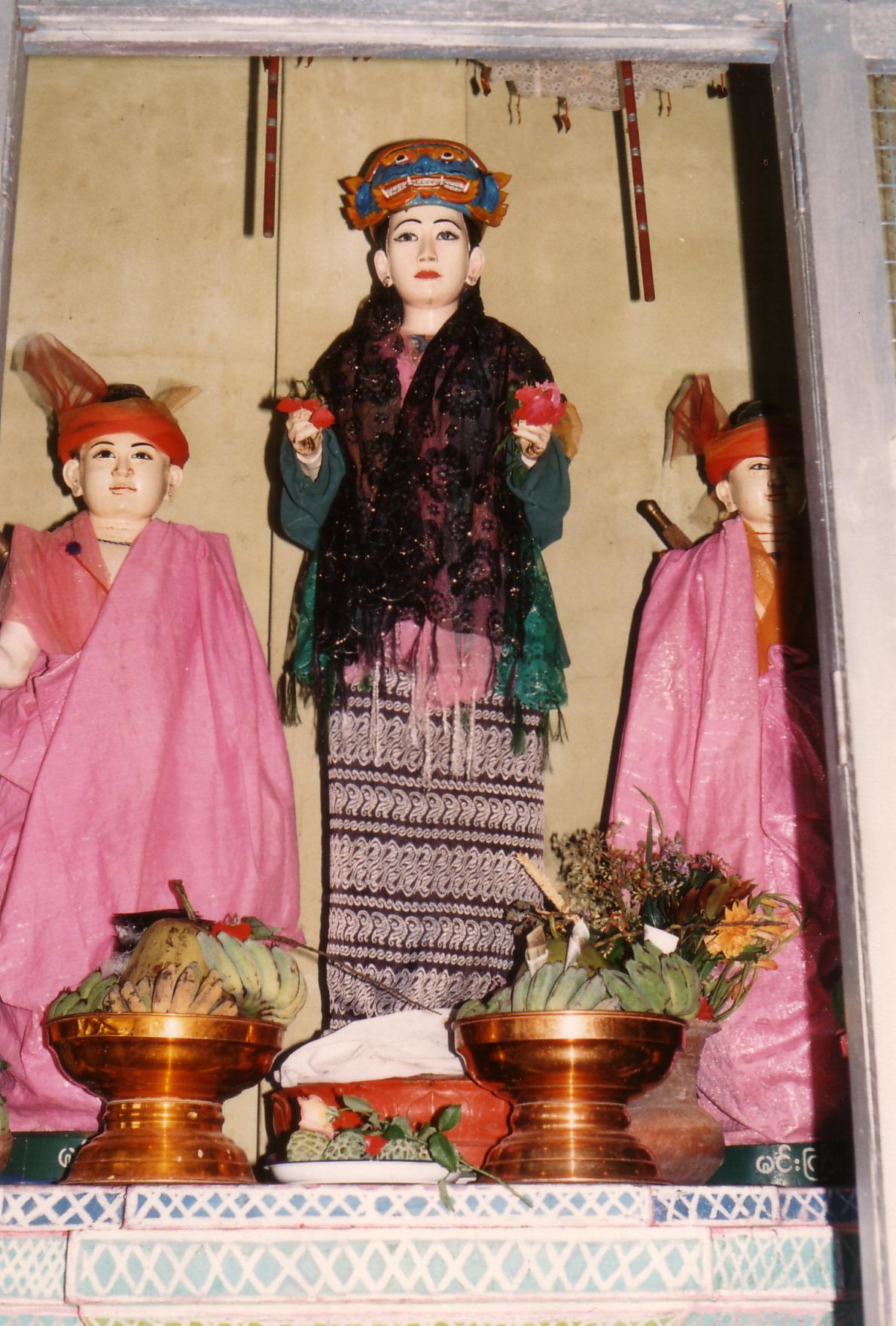
Me Wunna with her sons Min Gyi and Min Lay at Mount Popa

Melford Spiro notes that while Burmese Buddhism emphasizes suffering as the result of one's past and present karma, which can be transformed through ethical conduct, meditation, and the accumulation of merit in this life and future lives, Burmese folk practice situates the existence of misfortune within a cosmology populated by spirits (nats) and their interactions with the external world. Rather than being seen as contradictory, these perspectives are often integrated: Nat spirits themselves are regarded as sentient beings within the Buddhist saṃsāra, subject to karma and rebirth, and thus part of the wider Buddhist moral universe. Rituals such as offerings to the nats, ceremonies of respect, and even exorcism practices of harmful spirits can therefore be understood not as deviations from Buddhism but as culturally specific ways of negotiating karmic misfortune, accumulating merit, and maintaining harmony with unseen beings. In this way, nat worship has become embedded within Burmese Buddhist practice as a complementary system of belief and ritual.

Burmese folk faith consists of many different kinds of festivals that all involve singing and dancing, drinking and merriment, or nat-pwes. These festivals are a way for people to let go and enjoy themselves. This idea of relieving stress and indulging in various pleasures is very different from the traditional doctrine of Buddhism, which emphasises losing all desires. This can often be done by fasting or through deep meditation in a quiet temple. These traditional Buddhist practices offer a starkly different way of achieving religious consciousness.

Amongst the individual villages, religious beliefs also vary greatly. Although there are thirty-seven main nats that are commonly and communally worshipped, there are also many local nats, differing in every village. To add on to this, the idea that after death one may become a nat also implies that many nats can be worshipped. For some villages, nats are in nearly everything. They can be any ancestors, in nature, found guarding objects etc. For others, nats are less prominent, but still play some role in the village society.

A particularly strong sense of folk faith is found in the tribal areas of Myanmar. In this instance, there is no divine being, and folk religion is practised entirely separately from Buddhism. In these tribal societies, all nats are traditionally viewed as harmful, unlike in other villages where nats are invited to partake in festivals. Instead of adorning these nats with offerings and food, the most effort is put into fending off evil spirits. These tribes just want to be left alone, undisturbed by the malicious spirits.

== Thrity Seven Nats ==
The official pantheon of Thirty Seven Nats predates the colonial period. However, even by the early 20th century, nat worhsip practices primarily focused on local animist nats. Shway Yoe's 1882 book The Burman only briefly mentions the 37 nats before discussing other rituals, nats or ceremonies. The scholar Sarah Bekker contends the Victorian era fascination amongst colonial administrators wanted to record the nat worship as a system, but found participating in or describing the actual practices taboo. She identifies that Sir Richard Carnac Temple's book solidified the idea of the 37 nats.

According to Temple, the Thirty Seven Nats of the official pantheon can be grouped into cycles based on historical figures that their stories are associated with. The first cycle are nats related to Duttabaung, an early king of the Sri Ksetra Kingdom. They are:

- No. 2 Mahagiri
- No. 3 Hnamadawgyi
- No. 4 Shwe Nabay
- No. 5 Thonbanhla
- No. 13 Taungmagyi
- No. 14 Maungminshin
- No. 37 Shin Nemi

An extraordinarily strong blacksmith named Maung Tint De was burnt alive by Duttabaung, becoming the lord of Mount Popa, becoming Mahagiri. His sister, who was married to Duttabung, leapt into the fire becoming Hnamadawgyi. Tint De's wife was the daughter of sea serpents, Shwe Nabay, and her two sons Taungmagyi and Maungminshin were ordered to box each other to death. Thonbanhla was another wife of Duttaung, who was neglected despite her beauty and Shin Nemi is her daughter.

The second cycle is the Anawrahta cycle, being associated with the 11th century conqueror. They are:

- No. 16 Nyaunggyin
- No. 24 Mandalay Bodaw
- No. 25 Shwe Hpyin Naungdaw
- No. 26 Shwe Hpyin Nyidaw
- No. 27 Mintha Maungshin
- No. 28 Htibyuhsaung
- No. 29 Htibyuhsaung Medaw
- No. 30 Yoma Shin Mingaung
- No. 36 Shingwa

Kunhsaw Kyaunghpyu, the king of Bagan had two sons Kyiso and Sokkate who overthrew their father violently. Kyiso became king and died accidentally becoming Yoma Shin Mingaung. Sokkate was challenged and slain by his half-brother Anawrahta, becoming Htibyuhsaung. His mother and Anawrahta's stepmother became Htibyuhsaung Medaw. These two king's third full-brother became Mitha Maungshin. Under Anawrahta's reign, two Indian Muslim brothers were slain under confused orders becoming Shwe Hpyin Naungdaw and Nyidaw. Their guardian became Mandalay Bodaw and the Bodaw's sister became Shingwa.

The third cycle is the related to the 14th century Ava king Minkhaung I, but can also be attributed to the Early Bagan Kingdom' of the 11th century reign of Sithu I of Bagan. They are:

- No. 7 Mintara
- No. 9 Shwe Nawrahta
- No. 10 Aungzwamagyi
- No. 11 Ngazishin
- No. 12 Aung Pinle Hsinbyushin
- No. 19 Shwe Sitthin
- No. 20 Medaw Shwezaga
- No. 31 Min Sithu
- No. 32 Min Kyawzwa
- No. 34 Anauk Mibaya
- No. 35 Shingon

King Tarabya of Ava died of fever, becoming Mintara. He was succeeded by Minkhaung I. One of his senior queens, Shin Mi-Nauk, had two sons Sithu and Kyawzwa who quarralled and killed each other, becoming the respective nats Min Sithu and Min Kyawzwa. Their mother died of shock became Anauk Mibaya. Mikhaung I was succeeded by his son Thihathu, who became Aung Pinle Hisnbyushin after being murdered at the Aung Pinle lake. Thihathu's son Kyawswa I of Pinya died of a fever after procuring five white elpehants, becoming Ngazishin. Thihathu had a concubine who died of sudden illness becoming Shingon. Much later in the dynasty, Minkhaung II's son and heir Shwenankyawshin drowned his nephew Shwe Nawrahta for supposed rebellion.

Anauk Mibaya is also confused with a different queen of a 9th century King Thein Khun in Bagan. That queen's step-great great grandson King Saw Khin Hnit cruelly put his son Shwe Sitthin to death and causing his wife Medaw Shwezaga to die of grief. Anauk Mibaya is also confused with a later Bagan king. This interpretation then attributes Min Sithu as Sithu II of Bagan. He enlisted the help of a military officer Aungzwa to murder his brother Naratheinkha and take the throne. The officer Aungzwa becomes Aungzwamagyi.

The fourth cycle is related to the founder of the First Toungoo Empire. They are:

- No. 17 Tabinshwehti
- No. 6 Taungoo Mingaung
- No. 33 Myaukhpet Shinma
- No. 8 Thandawgan

The empire was founded by king Tabinshwehti, who was murdered by one of his ministers, becoming a nat. His son Mikhaung was made the "king" of Taungoo, but was subservient to his older brother and emperor Bayinnaung. Mikhaung became Taungoo Mingaung and his mother, who died giving birth to him, became Myaukpet Shinma. He also had a secretary who died of a snake bite, becoming Thandawgan.

The fifth cycle is closely related, surrounding Bayinnaung's life. They are:

- No. 15 Shindaw
- No. 18 Minye Aungdin
- No. 22 Yun Bayin
- No. 23 Maung Minbyu

All four are sons of kings related to the nascent Taungoo empire's rise. Shindaw was a young son of Nyaungyan Min who died of a snake bite while he was a novice Buddhist monk. Minye Aungdin was the son of Anaukpetlun. Maun Minbyu was Bayinnaung's son and Yun Baying was the last king of Lan Na.

There are two nats and don't fit in any other cycle. The first is the king of the pantheon No. 1 Thagyamin, who is a Burmese version of Indra. No. 21 Maung Po Tu nat was a trader from the Pinya Kingdom who was killed by a tiger on the way home.

The numbering used above follows the traditional 1766 Myawaddy Mingyi U Swa ordering.

== Folk beliefs and practices ==
Various forms of folk practices are held in Myanmar today, often with folk religious roots. As mentioned earlier, though, it is difficult to determine to what extent these beliefs and traditions are practised, because every village has slightly different beliefs and practices. Their astrology, thought to be descended from Indian religious beliefs, is present in Myanmar. With this astrology comes the practice of divination and horoscopes.

There are also several different folk methods that are thought to keep away troublesome nats or evil spirits. These include wearing amulets or tattoos, which were said to keep the spirits away. This was also seen in the form of various people, who are believed to have magical powers or the ability to interact with spirits. These include alchemists, healers, sorcerers and exorcists.

These exorcists, or ahletan hsaya, are said to possess powers that can fend away or challenge these evil demons. These exorcists were often seen as very holy because they had to be to combat troublesome spirits. They attempt exorcisms by giving the nat offerings. As an interesting overlap with Buddhism, exorcisms can be performed by holding the Buddha up to the possessed person, in an effort to have the Nat flee. If the exorcist cannot banish this spirit alone, they often ask for the assistance of the nat-kadaw. Sorcerers, or weikzas also harnessed the power of these nats through many complex rituals to gain their own supernatural powers.

== See also ==
- Awgatha
- Mount Popa (Taung Kalat)
- Religion in Myanmar
- Chinese folk religion in Southeast Asia
- Tai folk religion
- Vietnamese folk religion
- Malaysian folk religion
- Satsana Phi
- Shinto
- Wuism
- Muism
