= Thurathadi =

Buddhist goddess from Myanmar, associated with the Hindu Saraswati

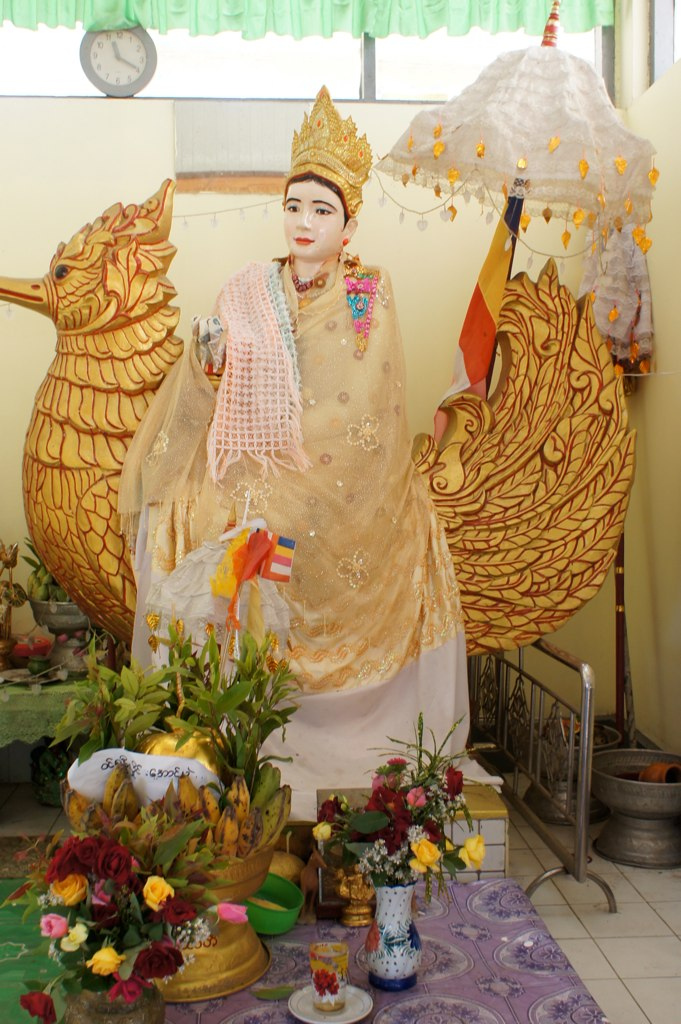
Thurathadi (Saraswati) at the Kyauktawgyi Buddha Temple (Yangon).

Thurathadi (သူရဿတီ), also spelled Thuyathadi or Thayéthadi is a goddess in the Buddhist pantheon of Myanmar. She is one of the higher nats, guarding the Buddhist scriptures and promoting the welfare of scholars and writers. Students in Myanmar pray for her blessings before exams.

== Origin and name ==
The name Thurathadi is a Burmese rendering of the Sanskrit name Saraswati. The word "Saraswati" is derived from "Saras" (meaning "together" or "flowing water") and "Vati" (meaning "possessor"), suggesting "she who possesses flowing water" or "sweet speech". Some scholars also believe she was originally a river goddess guarding the Sarasvati River, and later became known as the consort of Brahma, the creator god in Hinduism.

She was later incorporated into Mahayana and Tantric Buddhism, including in Myanmar, where she became Thurathadi. Burmese Tantraists transformed the Brahmanical Saraswati into a local form—Thurathadi or Surasati—who became the guardian goddess of the Three Pitakas and learning.

== Worship ==
Thurathadi is worshipped by some Burmese Buddhists in temples and private courtyards. In Burmese belief, she is especially venerated as the protector of literature, education, and Buddhist scriptures. Her worship dates back to the Bagan Kingdom, particularly during the reign of King Anawrahta. According to records, she is one of the 37 official nats enshrined in the Shwezigon Pagoda, numbered as the 9th nat.

Her image shows her in divine attire, seated on a golden Hintha bird, holding lotus flowers in both hands. Since the Hintha feeds on water, this symbolism associates her with rivers and the purity of speech and learning. She is also invoked through rituals such as the Surasati Gatha, Mantra, In, and Mhao. However, Burmese tradition emphasizes that her blessings are for worldly benefits, such as charm and knowledge, rather than spiritual liberation.

== Iconography ==
Thurathadi is commonly depicted riding side-saddle on a golden Hintha (hamsa) bird, with her legs dangling. She typically holds one or more Tipitaka manuscripts in her right hand.

== Legend and historical mentions ==
According to the Shwezigon Mon Inscription dated 1084 AD:

"The wisdom of eloquence, called Saraswati, shall dwell in the mouth of King Sri Tribhuwanadityadhammaraja at all times." – Translated by Than Tun

She is also mentioned in various local legends as being the mother of a future king and his queen, Mya Sein Yaung, and was prophesied to be reborn as a male and attain Buddhahood. Her statue is found behind and beside Bo Bo Aung at his shrine near Bagan.

Thurathadi is honored as one of the most senior nats after Thagyamin, regarded as a principal supporter of Buddhism. Her connection with the scriptures lends a scholarly and sacred character to her image, particularly in Burmese weizza cults and esoteric traditions.

== Variety of interpretations ==
Goddess worship in India predates the Vedic period, with archaeological evidence from the Indus Valley Civilization showing goddess figurines circa 2000 BCE. During the Vedic period, goddesses like Saraswati were integrated into Brahmanism. However, early Theravada Buddhism rejected gods such as Brahma and his consort. With the rise of Mahayana Buddhism, especially under the Sangha and Kushan dynasties, Hindu goddesses were incorporated into Buddhist practice.

Tantric Buddhism spread into Upper Burma via Bengal during the Sri Kshetra period, and artifacts from the site suggest the presence of Mahayana and Tantric worship. During King Anawrahta's reign, despite his reforms toward Theravada Buddhism, images like Surasati were retained within sacred spaces, symbolizing a synthesis of beliefs.

== See also ==
- Saraswati
- Nat (spirit)
- Bagan
- Tipitaka
- Hintha
