= Cheputarai =

King of Lanna (1675–1707)

Cheputarai: ᨻᩕᨸᩮ᩠ᨶᨧᩮᩢ᩶ᩣᨧᩮᨻᩪᨲᩕᩣ᩠ᨿ

Ruler of Chiang Mai In the Chiang Mai Chronicle
- Reign: 1675–1707
- Predecessor: Uengsae
- Successor: Nga Ngo
- Died: 1707
- Father: Chekuttra

Cheputarai or Chephutarai (Northern Thai: ᨻᩕᨸᩮ᩠ᨶᨧᩮᩢ᩶ᩣᨧᩮᨻᩪᨲᩕᩣ᩠ᨿ; Thai: เจพูตราย) was the ruler of Chiang Mai from 1675 until 1707, when it was under Burmese suzerainty.

== Mentions in Historical Records and Interpretations ==
The Chiang Mai Chronicle mentions this person only once:

"In the year 1037 of the Chula Sakarat, the Year of the Rabbit...the son of King Cheputarai was enthroned on the Crystal Throne that same year."

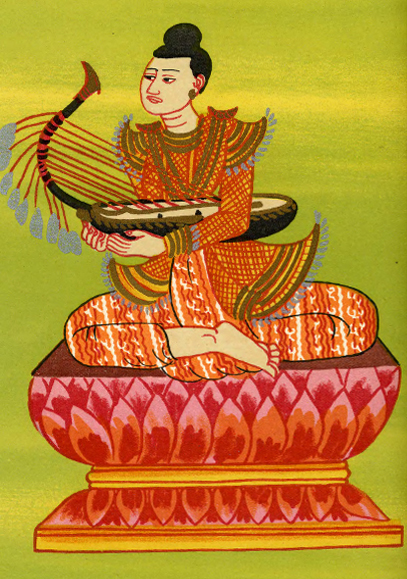
Minye Aungdin, one of the 37 Nat of Burma

Meanwhile, the Yonok Chronicle states:

"In the year 1047...the son of King Chekuttra ascended the throne of Chiang Mai."

Thus, he is known as Cheputarai, son of King Chekuttra, and is widely recognized through studies of the Chiang Mai Chronicle or later sources that cite it, such as the Yonok Chronicle.

However, the identity of Cheputarai contradicts Burmese records of Chiang Mai’s rulers. Additionally, debates regarding the identity of the Ruler of Phrae and the Viceroy Uengsae have led to speculation that records of Cheputarai may have been distorted from those of Minye Kyawhtin of Burma. He was the son of Minye Aungdin (Burmese: မင်းရဲအောင်တင်), the Prince of Siputtara.
