= Atar-oh =

Symbol of the Myanmar New Year

Atar-oh (Thingyan Pot)
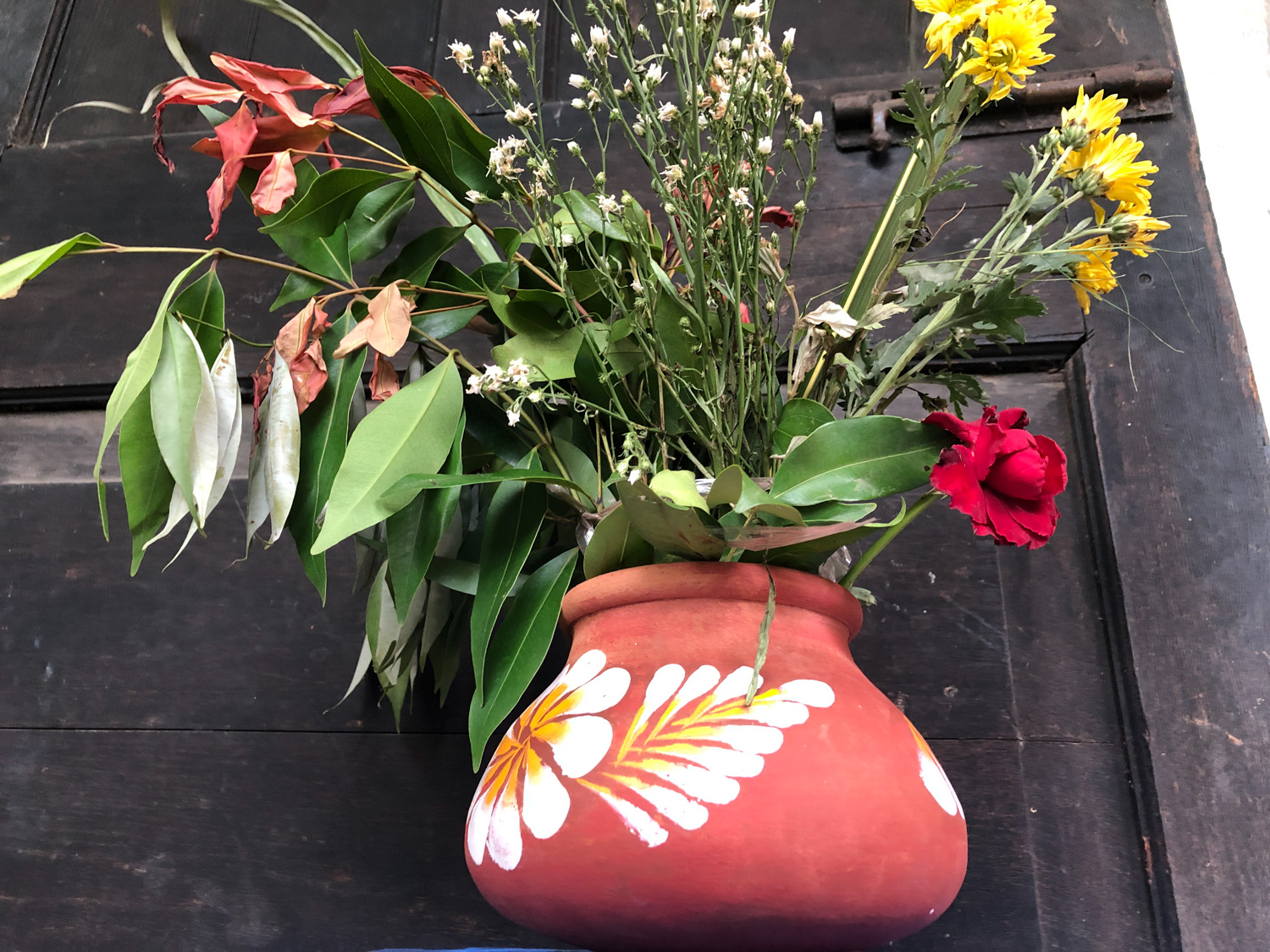
- A traditional Atar-oh filled with ritualistic flowers and sprigs.
- Observed by: Myanmar people
- Significance: Welcoming the New Year, ritual purification, and seeking auspiciousness.
- Date: Thingyan period (typically April 13 to 16/17)

Atar-oh (Burmese: အတာအိုး), also known as the Thingyan Pot, is a quintessential symbol of the traditional Myanmar New Year festival, Thingyan. The term "Thingyan" is derived from the Pali word Sankanta, meaning "transition" or "change," referring to the transit of the Sun from Pisces to Aries. The prefix "Atar" originates from the Pali word Anta, signifying "the end," thus the festival is also referred to as Atar Thingyan, marking the conclusion of the old year and the commencement of the new.

== History and Significance ==
The tradition of celebrating Thingyan dates back to the Tagaung period (c. 1st century AD) and gained significant prominence during the Bagan period. The Atar-oh serves as a ritualistic vessel to welcome Thagyamin (the King of Celestials) upon his annual descent to Earth. The terracotta pot is filled to the brim with fresh water, symbolizing an abundance of wealth and prosperity for the coming year, while acting as a spiritual anchor for peace and safety.

== Preparation and Floral Symbolism ==
In anticipation of the festival, families prepare the Atar-oh before the commencement of the "Akyo" (Eve) day. The pot typically contains seven types of flowers or sprigs, each representing a day of the week, ensuring that every member of the household is blessed regardless of their birth day. The traditional floral assignments are as follows:

- Sunday:Coconut palm leaves (Ohn)
- Monday:Gangaw or Khaye
- Tuesday:Plum leaves (Zi) or Jasmine (Sabai)
- Wednesday: Ywet-hla or Yezin-tama
- Thursday: Myey-zar (Bermuda grass) or Guava leaves
- Friday:Eugenia (Thabyay) – a paramount symbol of victory and success.
- Saturday: Tama or Dan (Henna)

== Traditional Beliefs and Rituals ==
Upon the official "descent" of the New Year (Thingyan Kya), families often perform a ritual where the water from the Atar-oh is poured out, and the sprigs are tucked into the eaves of the house or garden fences. This act is believed to wash away the misfortunes of the past year and invite improved destiny (Kan) and success in the social sphere.

On the first day of the New Year (Hnit-san Ta-yet), the Atar-oh is frequently transitioned into a "Paritta-oh" (Sacred Water Vessel). Buddhist monks chant protective verses over the water, which is then sprinkled throughout the home to provide divine protection and peace for the upcoming year.
