= Shwe Sitthin =

- Illustration of Shwe Sitthin from The Thirty-Seven Nats (1906)
- Venerated in: Burmese folk religion
- Parents: Saw Mon Nit (father); Medaw Shwezaga (mother)

Shwe Sitthin (Burmese: ရွှေစစ်သင်, lit. 'Golden Warrior'; also known as Myin Phyu Shin; lit. 'Lord of the White Horse') is one of the 37 Burmese nat spirits. He was a son of King Saw Khin Hnit, one of the last kings of the Early Bagan Kingdom by his consort Medaw Shwezaga, who is also one of the 37 nats.

He is said to have died after his father imprisoned him for neglecting his duties and cockfighting during wartime. In iconography, he is typically portrayed in a seated pose, adorned with a chadah-style golden crown, and holding a sword upright in his hand by its hilt.
