= Shin Nemi =

37th nat of the official Burmese pantheon

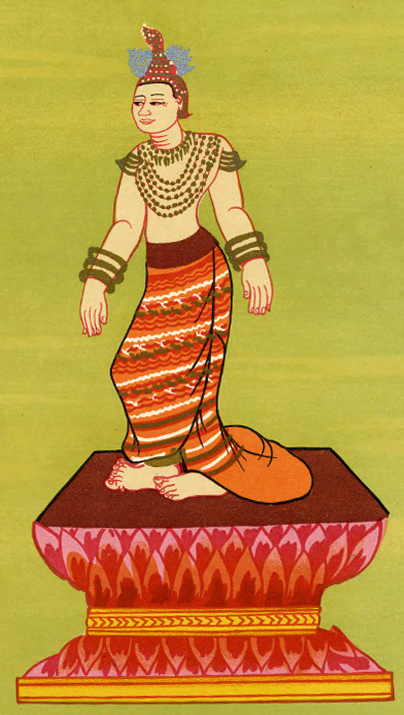
Shin Nemi

Shin Nemi (Burmese: ရှင်နှဲမိ, pronounced [ʃɪ̀ɰ̃ n̥əmḭ]), also known as Ma Hne Galay (မနှဲကလေး, IPA: [ma̰ n̥ɛ́ ɡəlé]; lit. 'Little Lady with the Flute') or Shin Mihne (ရှင်မိနှဲ, IPA: [ʃɪ̀ɴ mḭ n̥ɛ́]), is the 37th Burmese nat in the official pantheon and one of only two confirmed to have died in childhood, the other being Mintha Maungshin. She is the daughter of Thonbanhla and died at the age of two out of grief for her mother's own death.

Shin Nemi is usually depicted as a topless girl wearing an embroidered skirt and headdress.
