= Shingon (nat) =

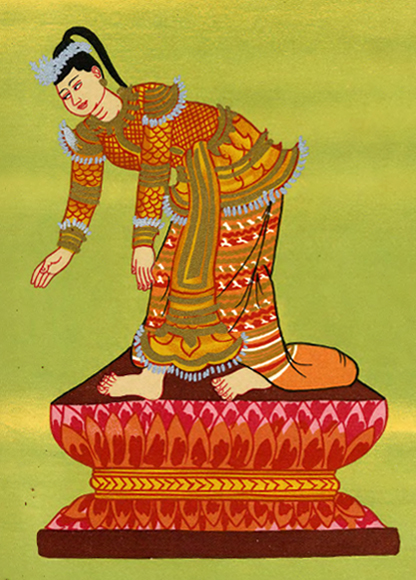
Shingon Nat

Shingon (Burmese: ရှင်ကုန်း [ʃɪ̀ɰ̃ ɡóʊɰ̃]; lit. 'Lady Humpback') is one of 37 nats in the official Burmese pantheon of nats. She was a maid of King Thihathu of Ava and accompanied him to the battlefront. She died on her return to the capital, Ava (modern Inwa).

Shingon is portrayed walking limply with her hands dangling.
