= Maungminshin =

One of the 37 nats in the official Burmese pantheon

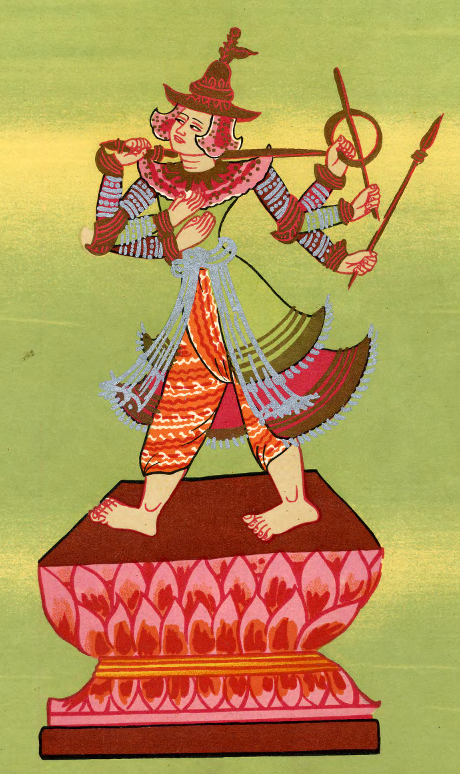
Shin Byu Nat

In Burmese Buddhism, Maung Min Shin (Burmese: မောင်မင်းရှင်, [màʊɰ̃ mɪ́ɰ̃ ʃɪ̀ɰ̃]), also called Shin Byu (ရှင်ဖြူ, [ʃɪ̀ɴ bjù]), is one of the 37 official nats in the Burmese pantheon.

He is believed to represent a historical figure, the brother of Taungmagyi Shinnyo (Shin Nyo), both sons of Maung Tinteta and Shwe Nabeata. They served under King Duttabaung of Prome. According to Burmese legends, the king, fearful of the brothers' growing strength and potential threat to his rule, ordered them to duel with swords. Both died of chest injuries sustained during the duel and were subsequently deified as nats.

The statue of Taungmagyi Shinnyo is depicted with a lotus seat, three lotuses on each side of the left and right, and six on each side of the right. His hands are raised and placed on the chest, with other hands holding a club, a sword, and a spear. He wears a short cap and full military attire. The image of his brother, the Northern King Shin Phyu Nat (Mrukmin), also features six arms and is similarly depicted in martial garb.
