= Shwezigon Pagoda =

Buddhist Pagoda in Bagan, Myanmar

- ရွှေစည်းခုံဘုရား
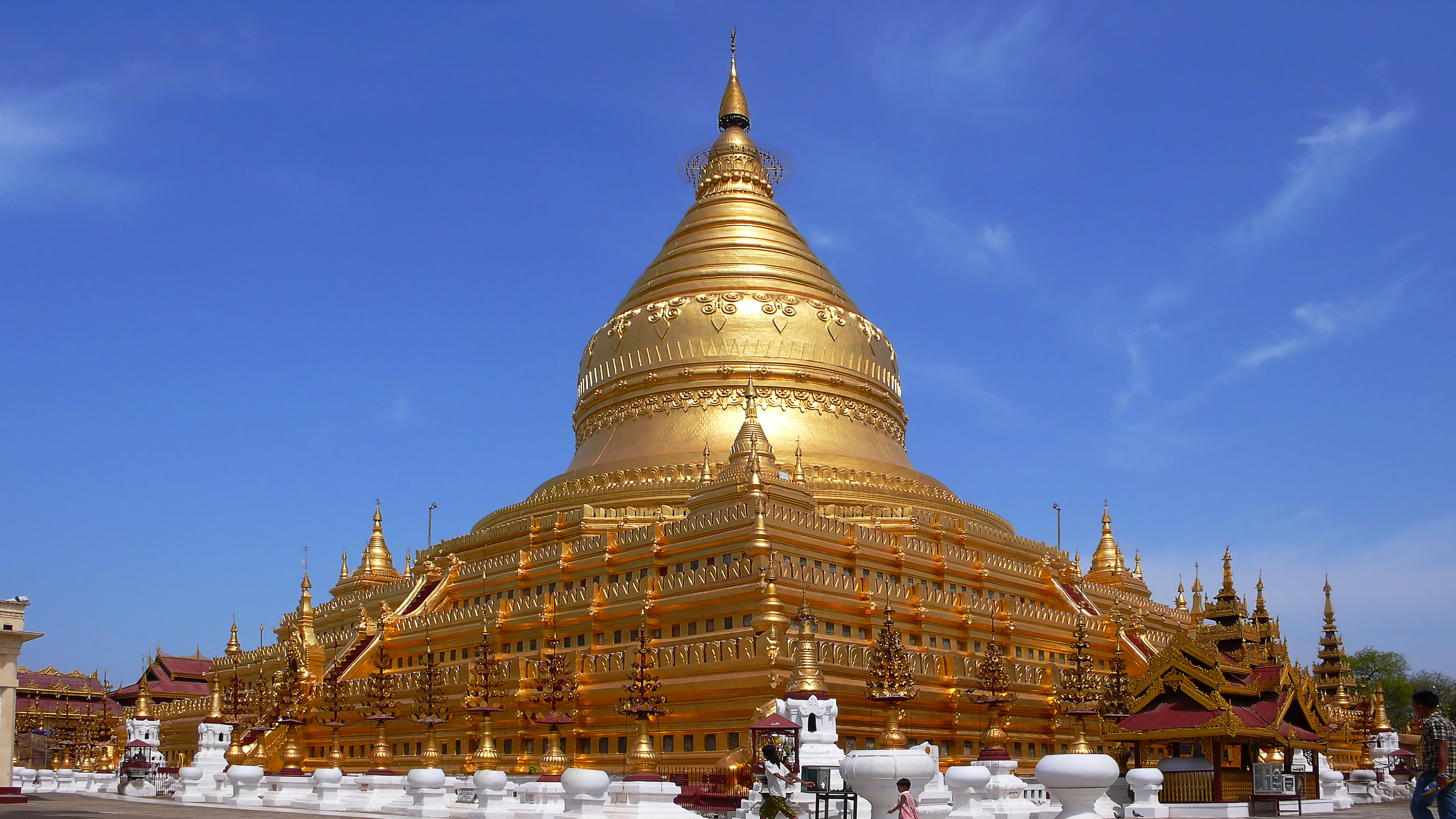

- Location within Myanmar

Religion
- Affiliation: Theravada Buddhism

Location
- Location: Nyaung-U, Myanmar
- Country: Myanmar
- Coordinates: 21°11′43″N 94°53′38″E

Architecture
- Founder: Anawrahta and Kyansittha
- Completed: 1102; 924 years ago
- Height (max): 48.8 m (160 ft)

The royal Shwezigon Pagoda or Shwezigon Paya (ရွှေစည်းခုံဘုရား [ɕwèzíɡòʊɰ̃ pʰəjá]) is a Buddhist stupa located in Nyaung-U, Myanmar. A prototype of Burmese stupas, it consists of a circular gold leaf-gilded stupa surrounded by smaller temples and shrines. Construction of the Shwezigon Pagoda began during the reign of King Anawrahta (r. 1044–1077), the founder of the Pagan Empire, in 1059–1060 and was completed in 1102, during the reign of his son King Kyansittha. Over the centuries, the pagoda had been damaged by many earthquakes and other natural calamities, and has been refurbished several times. In recent renovations, it has been covered by more than 30,000 copper plates. However, the lowest level terraces have remained as they were.

This pagoda, a sacred Buddhist religious place, is believed to enshrine a bone and tooth of Gautama Buddha. Some believe it is a replica of the Tooth Relic sent as a gift by the King of Sri Lanka. The pagoda is in the form of a cone formed by five square terraces with a central solid core. There are footprints below the four standing Buddha statues here. Jataka legends are depicted on glazed terra-cotta tiles set into three rectangular terraces. At the entrance of the pagoda there are large statues of guardians of the temple. There are also four bronze standing statues of Buddha which are stated to be of the current age Buddha. At the outer limits of the pagoda there are 37 nats deified along with an intricately carved wooden sculpture of Thagyamin, the Burmese version of the Indian god Indra. Within the compound of the Shwezigon Pagoda there is a stone pillar containing Mon language inscriptions dedicated by Kyansittha.

== Location ==
The pagoda, a pilgrimage centre, is located close to Bagan or Pagan (known as "a land of thousand pagodas") in the plains in the Shwe Zigon settlement at Nyaung-U.

== History ==
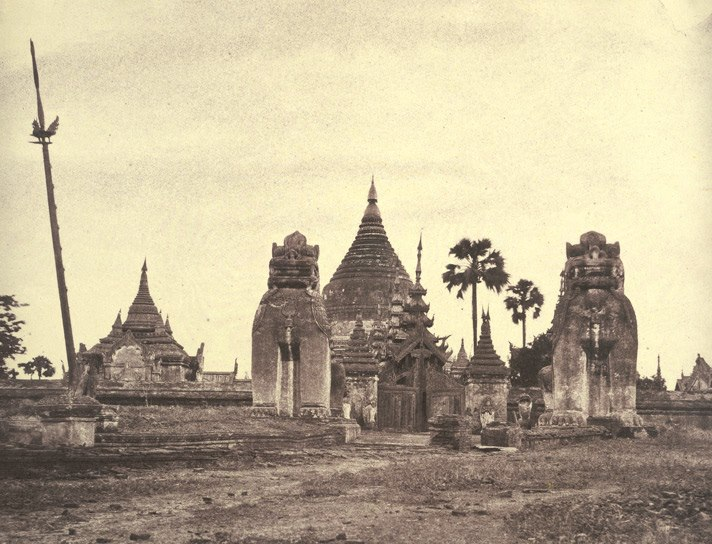
Shwezigon Pagoda in 1855

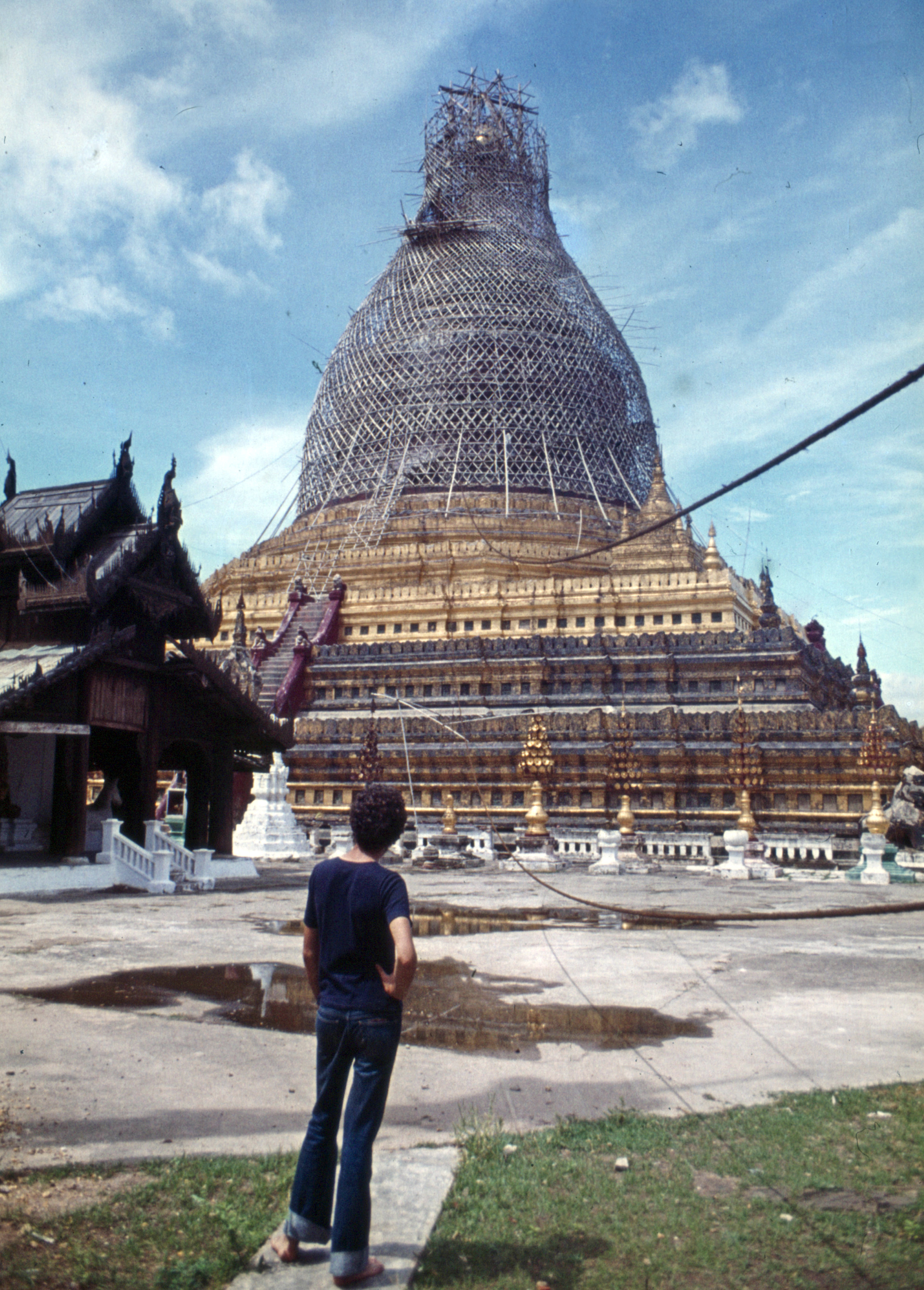
One year after earthquake 1975

Chronicles of the Kings of Burma have attributed that King Anawrahta (r. 1044–77) initiated its construction during 1059–1060. According to legend, Anawrahta selected the site for building this pagoda by sending a white elephant mounted with a frontal bone relic or replica of tooth relic(In some sources it is shown as a frontal bone relic and in some sources as a tooth replica.) of the Buddha to roam freely with the declaration that wherever the elephant stopped would be the site for building the pagoda. The elephant finally stopped over a dune which was chosen as the site for erecting the pagoda, hence the name Shwezigon pagoda meaning "golden pagoda on a dune" in Burmese. Pagoda means "stupa" or "zedi."

Some sources mention the frontal bone relic as being enshrined in the Shwezigon Pagoda, but the frontal bone relic(forehead bone relic) was already enshrined in the Seruvila Stupa in Sri Lanka in the 2nd century BC, as shown in the Sinhala Dhathuvamsa, Pali Dhathuvamsa, and Jinakalamali Thai texts. The Dhathuvamsa is a chronicle written about the forehead bone relic of the Buddha.

However, the pagoda was then completed by his son King Kyansittha (r.1084–1112/13). While its lower terraces were built by Anawrahta, the remaining structure is credited to Kyansittha. Its final completion date is 1086 and the footprints below the four standing Buddha statues here are also believed to be of the same period. The pagoda is a replica of the pyramidal Mahabodhi Temple at Bodh Gaya, the location of Buddha's illuminating realisation in India.

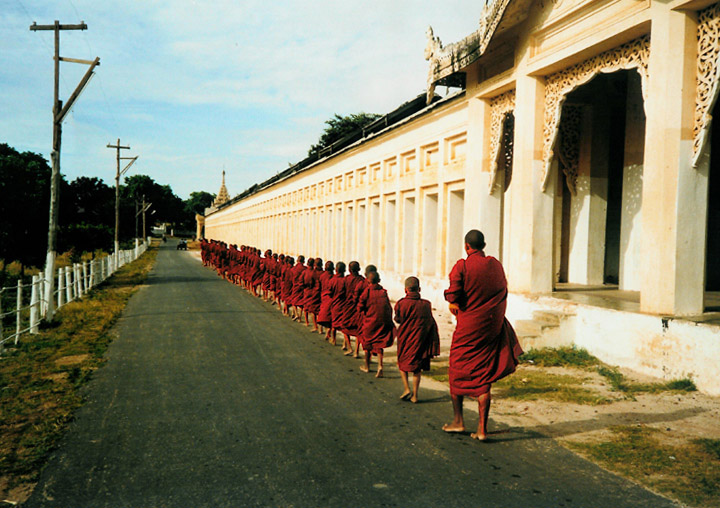
Buddhist monks at Shwezigon Pagoda in 1999

The pagoda has been damaged by earthquakes and other natural calamities over the centuries, and has been refurbished from time to time. A notable renovation was carried out by King Bayinnaung (r. 1550–1581) during late 16th century. In the 1975 earthquake there was considerable damage to the spire and the dome necessitating large renovation. It is now substantially strengthened with a covering of more than 30,000 copper plates, which were donated by local and international devotees; gilding of the dome has been done during 1983–1984 and again in recent times. However, the pagoda's bottom level terraces have remained mostly in their original form.

== Features ==
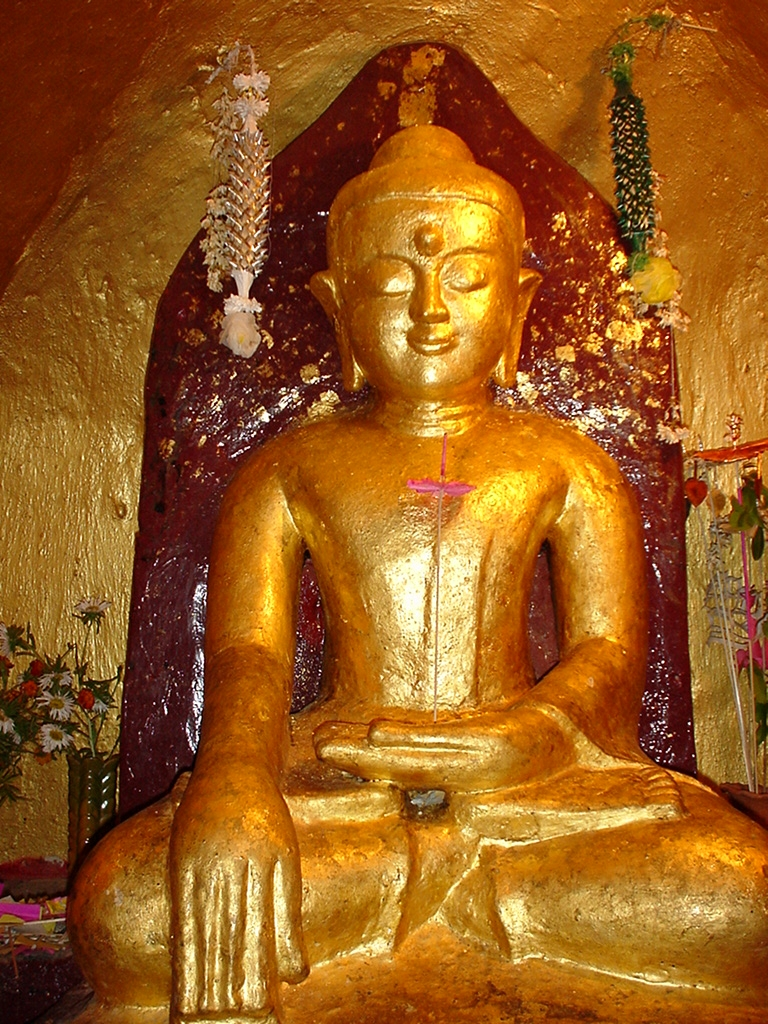
Buddha

The pagoda, a prototype of Burmese stupas, is like a bell-shaped stupa in traditional Mon people, which became the prototype architectural feature for many stupas built in the then Burma (now Myanmar). It has features of staircases, gates, and a richly ornamented spire fitted with a large golden umbrella type finial embedded with gems. The relics that are believed to be enshrined in the pagoda are Buddha's collar-bone and his frontal bone from Prome, and his tooth from Ceylon. On the outer limits of the pagoda there is a shrine where 37 nats are deified along with an intricately carved wooden sculpture of Thagyamin, Buddhist deva Sakka, king of the nats, which is believed to be 900 years old; it is the Burmese version of the Indian god Indra holding his weapon, the thunderbolt. These shrines of 37 nat spirits have been built to circumambulate as a homage to these relics.

The pagoda, which rises with five square terraces has a central solid core. The terraces rise steeply in the form of a pyramid topped with umbrellas or chatris. The entire edifice, from the base to the tip, appears like a cone. From the four cardinal directions there are steps from the base to the terraces at the centre to provide access to devotees to go up for worship; these terraces are fitted with instructions on slabs narrating events from the life of Buddha and other Buddhist scriptures. The interior, though conceived as a solid body, has a maze of interconnected narrow passages, where devotees affix dedicatory slabs on the walls by paying a donation, and praying for special blessings. Even though the relics have not been found in the pagoda, believed to have been stolen, devotees still feel the sanctity of the stupa and embed slabs hoping to attain Nibbana from the "force field" created by the embedded relics.

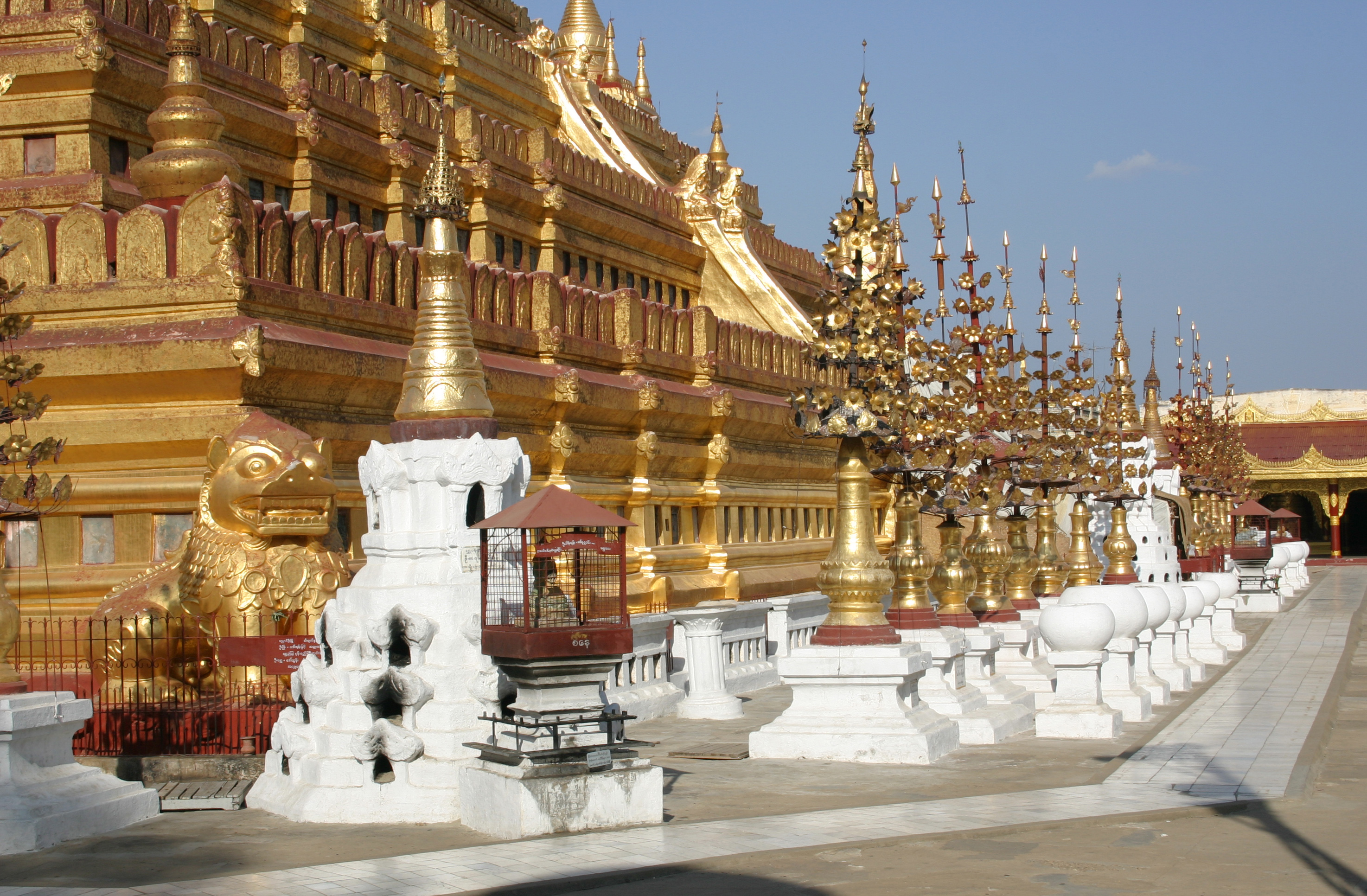
Exterior decorations

At the entrance to the pagoda there are huge statues of guardians of the temple, known as chinthes which are leogryphs (lion shaped gryphs). Out of the four entrances to the pagoda only the southern and western ones are in use. There are 550 glazed terra-cotta tiles inscribed with the Jataka tales fixed on three of the five terraces of the pagoda; the earlier count was 584 tiles of which some are not found now. The four flights of steps provide access to the terraces leading to an octagonal platform over which the gilded stupa has been built. At the four corners of the top most terrace, smaller replicas of the main pagoda are affixed at their back side, fitted with four gilded kalashas or vases; similar replicas are also fixed at the corners in the lower terraces. At the base of the pagoda, there are containers fitted closely and set in series, which have gilded bronze castings of plants and flowers, with alms bowls carved in stone in between. Around the exterior periphery of the pagoda there are several temples and wooden pavilions decorated with the pyatthat (multi-tiered and spired roofs).

The pagoda houses what worshippers believe is the footprint of Lord Buddha. There are four bronze standing statues of Buddha which are 12 to 13 feet (3.7 to 4.0 m) in height, which are stated to be of the current age Buddha deified on the four sides of the temple; these four are Kakusandha Buddha in the northern face, Koṇāgamana Buddha in the eastern wall, Kassapa Buddha in the southern wall and the Gautama Buddha to the west wall. All of these Buddhas are cast in beaten bronze and seen with their right hand in a posture of abhayamudra, meaning "the fear not gesture" and the left hand holding the monk's robe. Below the Buddha Kassapa statue there are a pair of footprints intricately carved on sandstone slab; these were carved from a large "Bodhi-leaf-shaped" slab. They have engravings of a chakra at the centre, which is considered an auspicious symbol. Devotees offer oblations to the footprints through a rectangular wedge created at the rear of the stone slab. The placing of the footprints gives the viewers an impression of Buddha walking towards them.

On one of the outer walls surrounding the Shwezigon Pagoda there is a stone pillar with Mon language inscriptions dedicated by King Kyansittha.

== See also ==
- Cetiya
- Burmese pagoda
- Bupaya Pagoda
- Dhammayazika Pagoda
- Mingalazedi Pagoda
- Shwesandaw Pagoda (Bagan)
- Lawkananda Pagoda

== Bibliography ==
- Gärtner, Uta (1994). Tradition and Modernity in Myanmar: Proceedings of an International Conference Held in Berlin from May 7th to May 9th, 1993. LIT Verlag Münster. ISBN 978-3-8258-2186-9.
- Harvey, G.E. (1 July 2000). History of Burma. Asian Educational Services. ISBN 978-81-206-1365-2.
- Inc., Encyclopædia Britannica (1 May 2008). Encyclopedia of World Religions. Encyclopædia Britannica, Inc. ISBN 978-1-59339-491-2.
- Jarzombek, Mark M.; Prakash, Vikramaditya (4 October 2011). A Global History of Architecture. John Wiley & Sons. ISBN 978-0-470-90248-6.
- Köllner, Helmut; Bruns, Axel (1998). Myanmar (Burma). Nelles. ISBN 978-3-88618-415-6.
- SK, Lim (1 November 2011). Asia Civilizations: Ancient to 1800 AD. Asiapac Books Pte Ltd. ISBN 978-981-229-594-1.
