= Maung Po Tu =

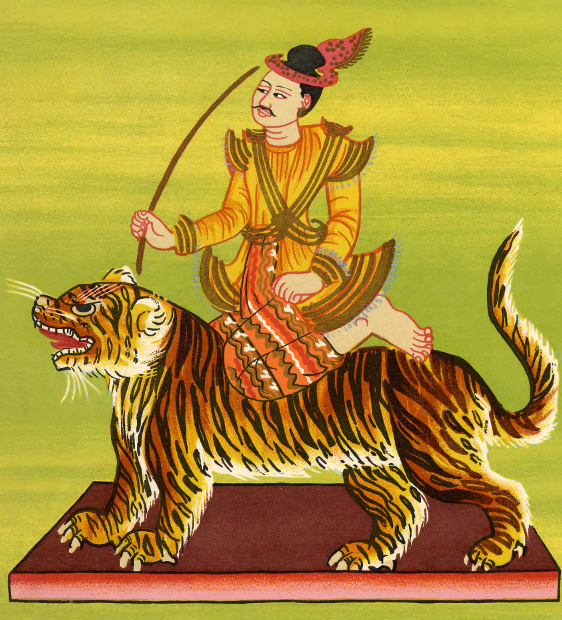
Maung Po Tu Nat

Maung Po Tu (Burmese: မောင်ဘိုးတူ [màʊɰ̃ pʰó tù]) is one of the 37 nats in the Burmese pantheon of nats. He was a tea trader during the reign of King Minkhaung I of Ava, and he was killed by a tiger on his way to Shan State. He is portrayed sitting on a tiger, a stick in his right hand, and his left hand on his thigh. Maung Po Tu is considered the guardian of traders and their businesses.
