= Nat (deity) =

Spirits venerated in Myanmar

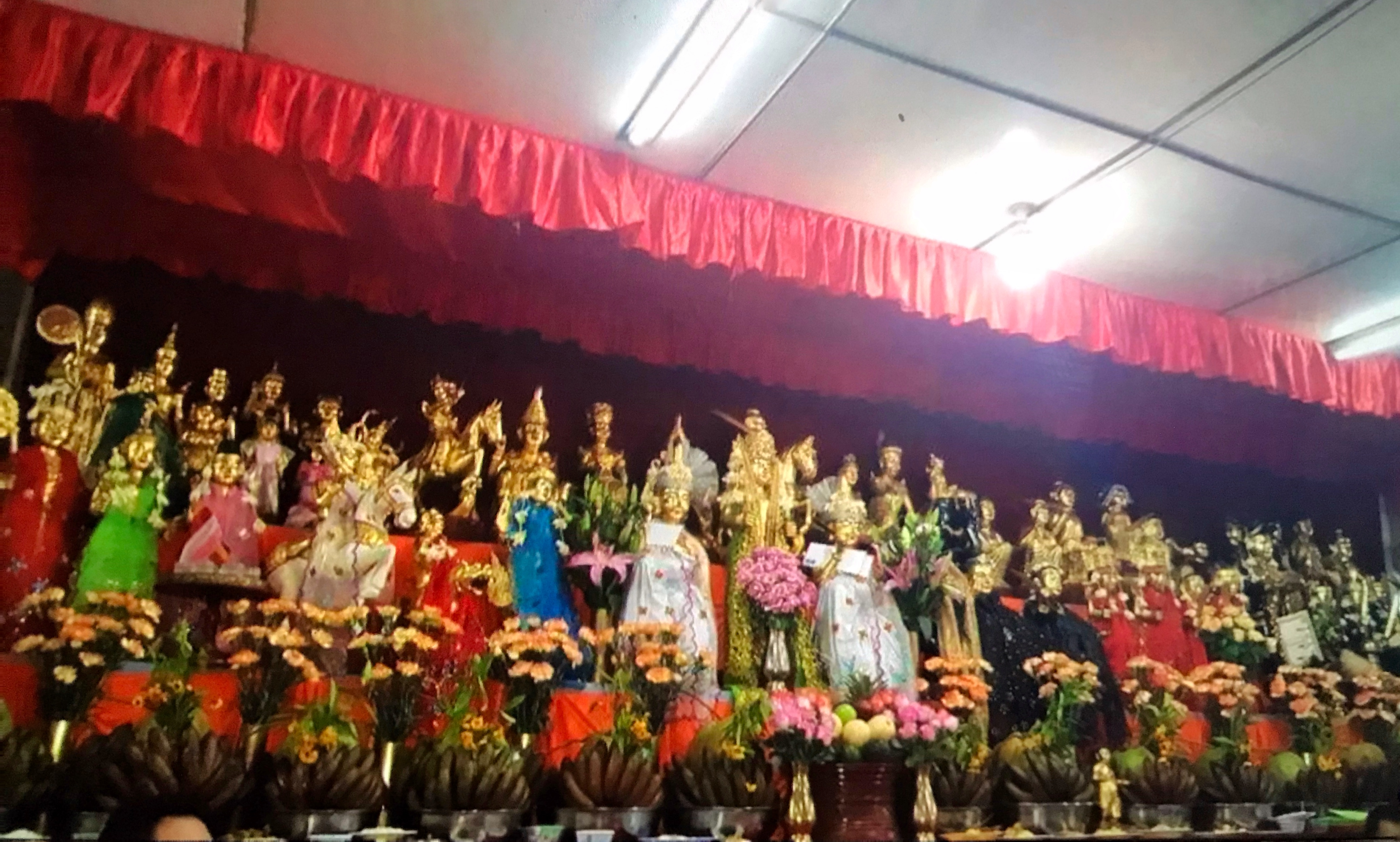
Burmese nat statues in the shrine

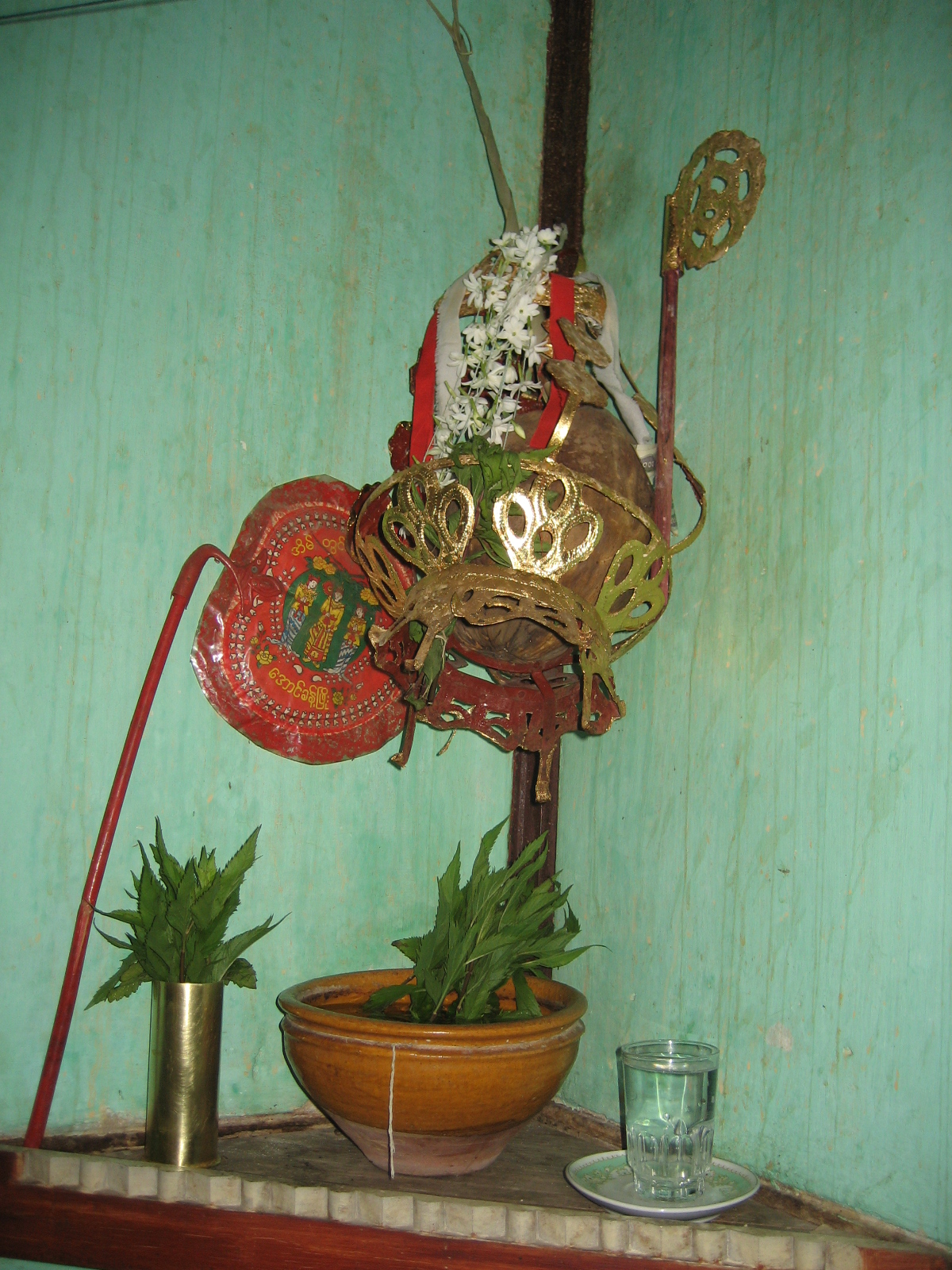
Nat oun hung on a post in a house

The nats (နတ်; MLCTS: nat; IPA: [naʔ]) are deities worshiped in Myanmar and neighbouring countries in conjunction with Buddhism. They are divided between the 37 Great Nats who were given that status by King Anawrahta when he formalized the official list of nats. Most of the 37 Great Nats were human beings who met violent deaths.

There are two types of nats in Burmese Belief: nat sein (နတ်စိမ်း), which are humans that were deified after their deaths, and all other nats, which are spirits of nature (spirits of water, trees etc.).

Much like sainthood, nats can be designated for a variety of reasons, including those only known in certain regions in Burma. Nat worship is less common in urban areas than in rural areas and is practised among ethnic minorities of Myanmar as well as in mainstream Bamar society. However, it is among the Theravada Buddhist Bamar that the most highly developed form of ceremony and ritual is seen.

Every Burmese village has a nat kun (နတ်ကွန်း) or nat sin (နတ်စင်), which essentially serves as a shrine to the village guardian nat called the ywa saung nat (ရွာစောင့်နတ်). Individual houses also have a shrine to a nat, usually a coconut is hung on a corner of the house or property, surrounded by perfume as an offering. One may inherit a certain member or, in some instances, two of the 37 Great Nats as mi hsaing hpa hsaing (မိဆိုင်ဖဆိုင်; lit. 'mother's side, father's side') from one or both parents' side to worship, depending on where their families originally come from. One also has a personal guardian deity called ko saung nat (ကိုယ်စောင့်နတ်).

== Nat worship and Hinduism ==
Due to being a neighbor of India, Burmese peoples naturally adopted and localized several Hindu deities before the arrival of Buddhism, forming cults for Beikthano (Vishnu), Byamma (Brahma), Maha Peinne (Ganesha), Sandi (Chandi), Thiwa (Shiva, also called "Paramethwa" - Parameshvara), Thuyathadi/Thurathadi (Sarasvati), and Thukanda (Skanda).

== Nat worship and Buddhism ==
Worship of nats predates Buddhism in Burma. With the arrival of Buddhism, however, the nats were syncretically merged with Buddhism. In his effort to convert the Burmese people from Ari Buddhism to Theravada Buddhism, Anawrahta used traditional nat spirits to attract people to his new religion. When asked why he allowed the nats to be placed in Buddhist temples and pagodas, Anawrahta answered, "Men will not come for the sake of new faith. Let them come for their old gods, and gradually they will be won over."

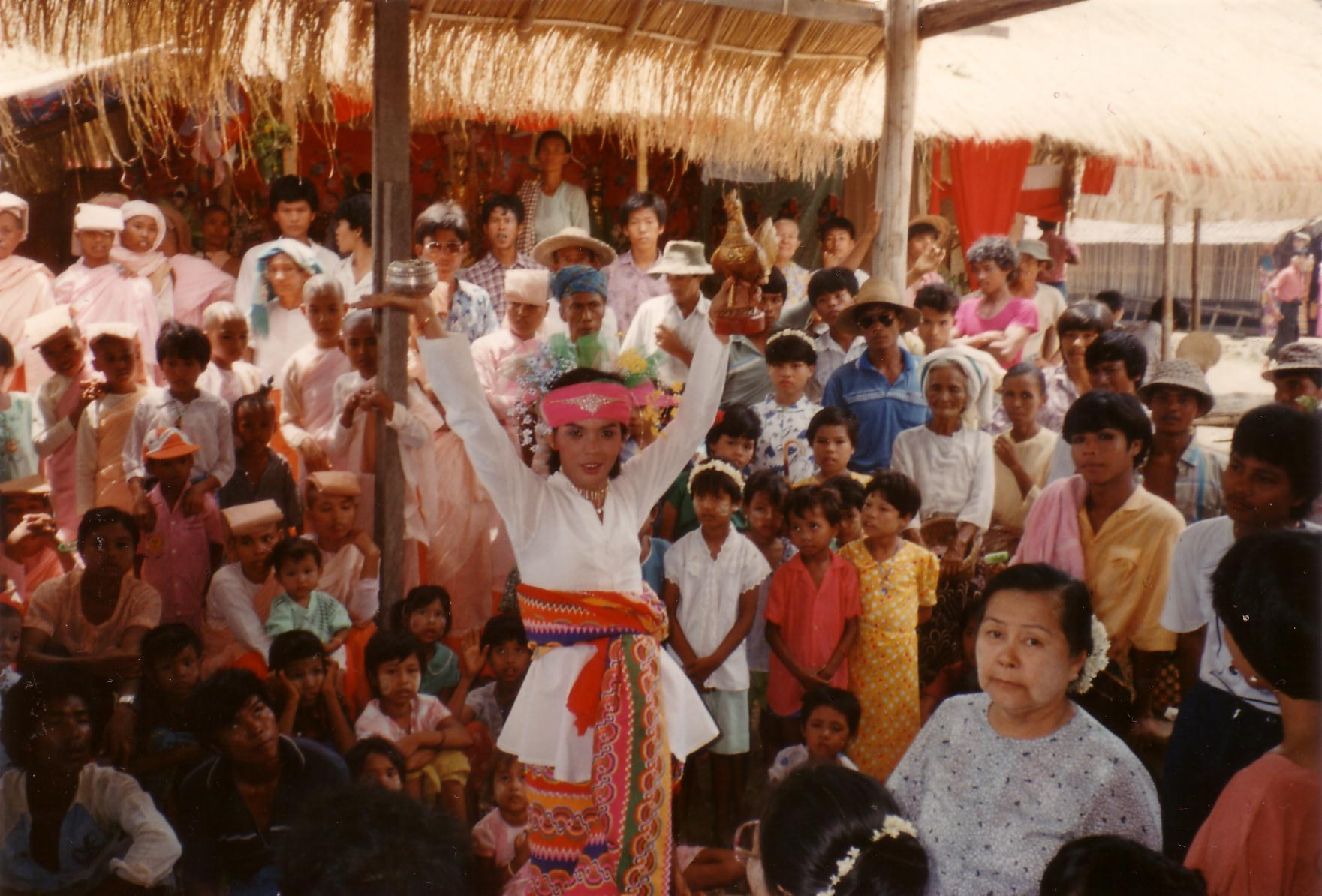
A nat kadaw dressed as U Min Gyaw at a nat pwè in Mingun, August 1989

Academic opinions vary as to whether Burmese Buddhism and Burmese spirit worship are two separate entities or merged into a single religion. As with the rise of globalization, the importance of the nat religion on modern Myanmar and its people has been diminished. The formalizing of the official 37 Great Nats by King Anawrahta (1044–1077) of Bagan, has been interpreted as Burmanisation and establishment of Bamar supremacy in the Irrawaddy valley after the unification of the country and founding of the First Burmese Empire.

== Nat worship and ecology ==
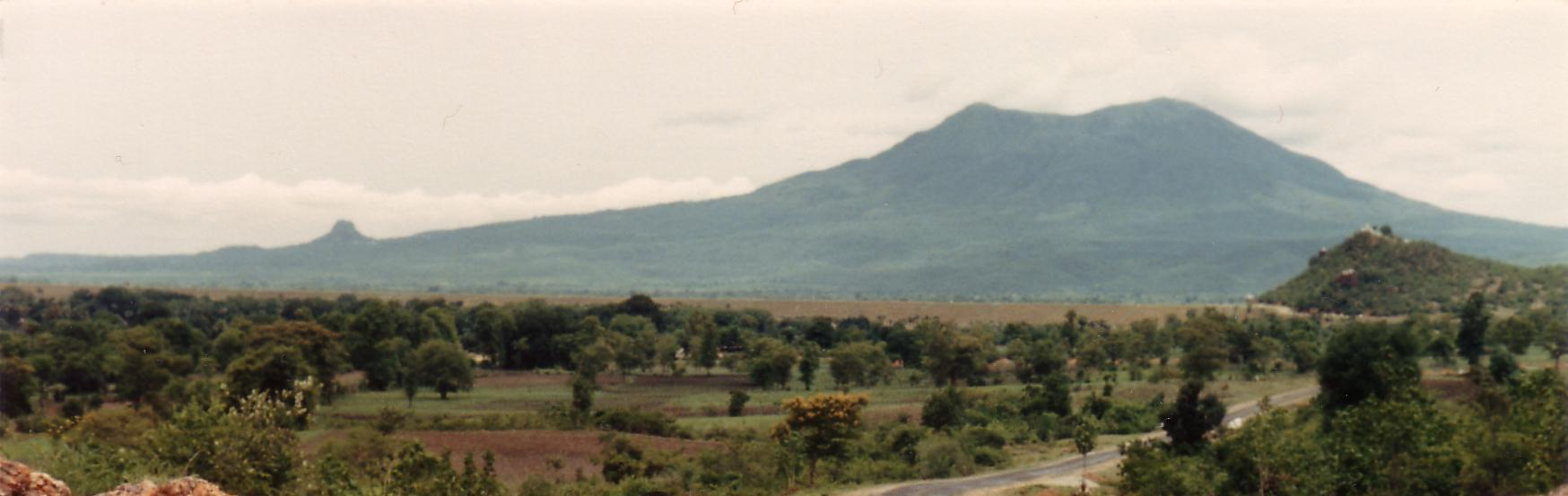
Mount Popa from Kyaukpadaung road, the smaller precipice Taung Kalat with its nat shrines atop to left of picture

The widespread traditional belief among rural communities that there are forest guardian spirits called taw saung nats (တောစောင့်နတ်) and mountain guardian spirits called taung saung nats (တောင်စောင့်နတ်) appears to act as a deterrent against environmental destruction, up to a point. Indiscriminate felling, particularly of large trees, is generally eschewed owing to the belief that they are dwellings of tree spirits called Yokkaso (ရုက္ခစိုး; tree spirit) and that such an act would bring the wrath of the nat upon the perpetrator.

== Popular nat festivals ==
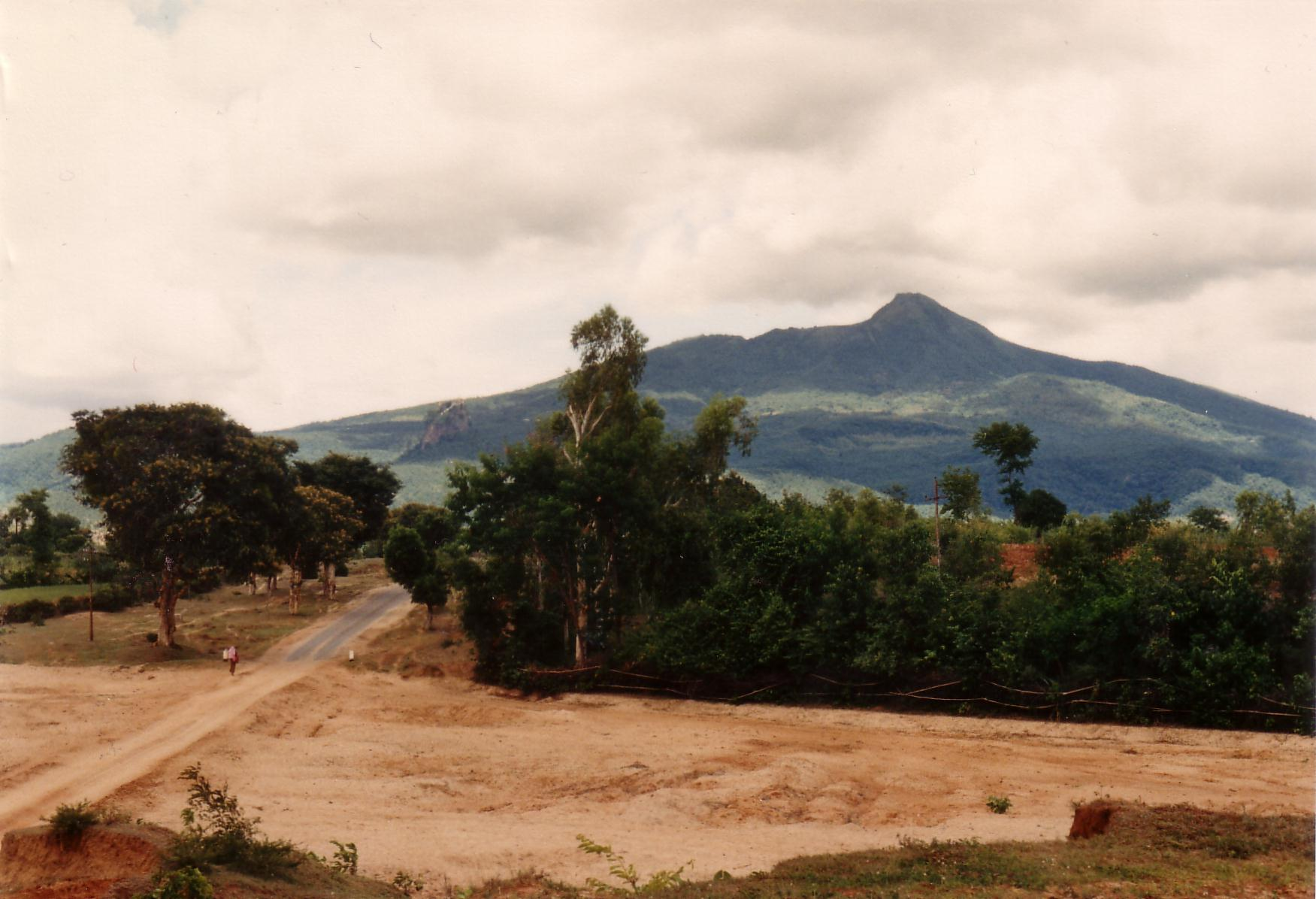
Mount Popa and Taung Kalat to left of picture seen from a distance across a dry riverbed

Offerings of alcohol and liquor to Min Kyawzwa at a nat pwe in Amarapura

The most important nat pilgrimage site in Burma is Mount Popa, an extinct volcano with numerous temples and relic sites atop a 1,300-metre-tall (4,300 ft) mountain located near Bagan in central Burma. The annual festival is held on the full moon of the month of Natdaw (December) of the Burmese calendar. Taungbyone, north of Mandalay in Madaya Township, is another major site with the festival held each year starting on the eleventh waxing day and including the full moon in the month Wagaung (August). Yadanagu at Amarapura, held a week later in honour of Popa Medaw ("Mother of Popa"), who was the mother of the Taungbyone Min Nyinaung ("Brother Lords"), is also a popular nat festival.

Nats are ascribed human characteristics, wants, and needs; they are flawed, having desires considered derogatory and immoral in mainstream Buddhism. During a nat pwè, which is a festival during which nats are propitiated, nat kadaws (နတ်ကတော် "wife of the spirit", i.e. "medium, shaman") dance and embody the nats. Historically, the nat kadaw profession was hereditary and passed from mother to daughter. Until the 1980s, few nat gadaws were male. Since the 1980s, persons identified by outsiders as trans women have increasingly performed these roles.

Music, often accompanied by a hsaing waing ("orchestra"), adds much to the mood of the nat pwè, and many are entranced. People come from far to take part in the festivities in various shrines called nat kun or nat naan, get drunk on palm wine and dance wildly in fits of ecstasy to the wild beat of the Hsaing waing music, possessed by the nats.

Whereas nat pwès are annual events celebrating a particular member of the 37 Great Nats regarded as the tutelary spirit in a local region within a local community, with familial custodians of the place and tradition and with royal sponsorship in ancient times, hence evocative of royal rituals, there are also nat kannah pwès where individuals would have a pavilion set up in a neighbourhood and the ritual is generally linked to the entire pantheon of nats. The nat kadaws as an independent profession made their appearance in the latter half of the 19th century as spirit mediums, and nat kannahs are more of an urban phenomenon which evolved to satisfy the need of people who had migrated from the countryside to towns and cities but who wished to carry on their traditions or yo-ya of supplicating the mi hsaing hpa hsaing tutelary deities of their native place.

== List of official nats ==
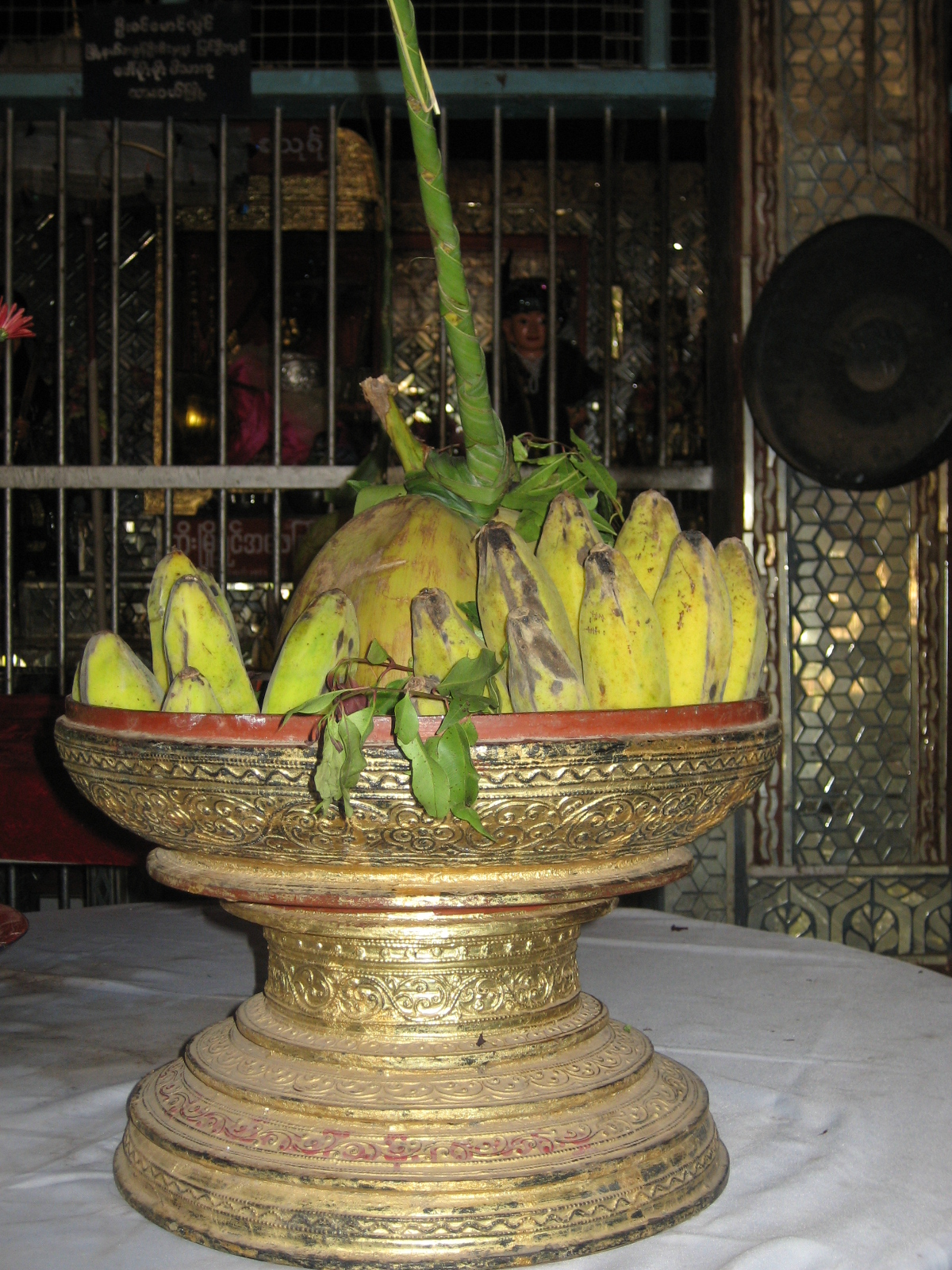
Traditional offerings of bananas and coconut at a nat shrine

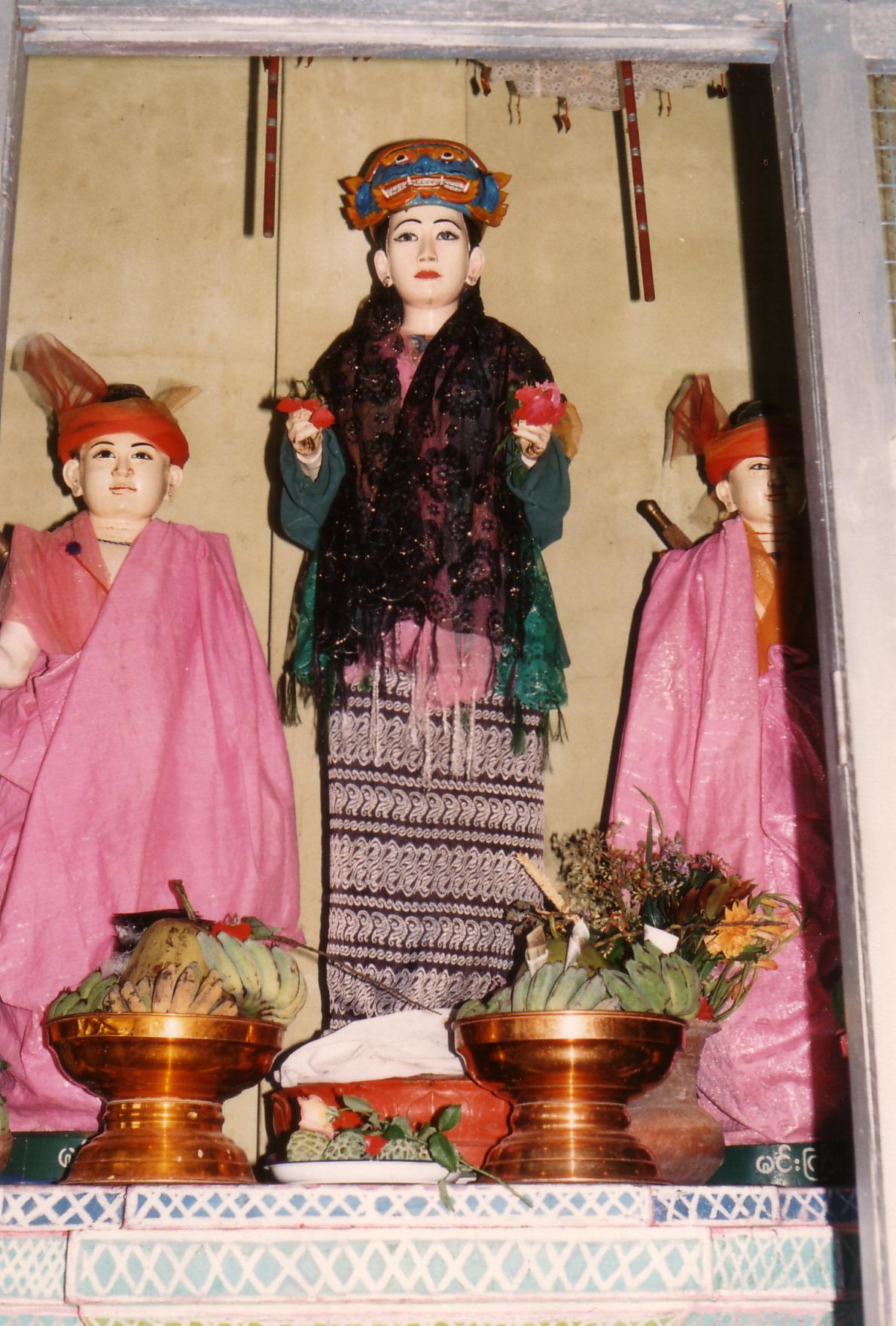
Me Wunna with her sons Min Gyi and Min Lay at Mount Popa

King Anawrahta of Bagan (1044–1077) designated an official pantheon of 37 Great Nats after he had failed to enforce a ban on nat worship. His stratagem of incorporation eventually succeeded by bringing nats to Shwezigon Pagoda portrayed worshipping Gautama Buddha and by enlisting Śakra, a Buddhist protective deity, to head the pantheon above the Mahagiri nats as Thagyamin. Seven out of the 37 Great Nats appear to be directly associated with the life and times of Anawrahta.

The official pantheon is made up predominantly of those from the royal houses of Burmese history, but also contains nats of Thai (Yun Bayin) and Shan (Maung Po Tu) descent; illustrations of them show them in Burmese royal dress. Listed in proper order, they are:

1. Thagyamin (သိကြားမင်း)
2. Min Mahagiri (မင်းမဟာဂီရိ)
3. Hnamadawgyi (နှမတော်ကြီး)
4. Shwe Nabay (ရွှေနံဘေး)
5. Thonbanhla (သုံးပန်လှ)
6. Taungoo Mingaung (တောင်ငူမင်းခေါင်)
7. Mintara (မင်းတရား)
8. Thandawgan (သံတော်ခံ)
9. Shwe Nawrahta (ရွှေနော်ရထာ)
10. Aungzwamagyi (အောင်စွာမကြီး)
11. Ngazi Shin (ငါးစီးရှင်)
12. Aung Pinle Hsinbyushin (အောင်ပင်လယ်ဆင်ဖြူရှင်)
13. Taungmagyi (တောင်မကြီး)
14. Maungminshin (မောင်မင်းရှင်)
15. Shindaw (ရှင်တော်)
16. Nyaunggyin (ညောင်ချင်း)
17. Tabinshwehti (တပင်‌ရွှေထီး)
18. Minye Aungdin (မင်းရဲအောင်တင်)
19. Shwe Sitthin (ရွှေစစ်သင်)
20. Medaw Shwezaga (မယ်တော်ရွှေစကား)
21. Maung Po Tu (မောင်ဘိုးတူ)
22. Yun Bayin (ယွန်းဘုရင်)
23. Maung Minbyu (မောင်မင်းဖြူ)
24. Mandalay Bodaw (မန္တလေးဘိုးတော်)
25. Shwe Hpyin Naungdaw (ရွှေဖျင်း နောင်တော်‌)
26. Shwe Hpyin Nyidaw (ရွှေဖျင်း ညီတော်)
27. Mintha Maungshin (မင်းသား မောင်ရှင်)
28. Htibyuhsaung (ထီးဖြူဆောင်း)
29. Htibyuhsaung Medaw (ထီးဖြူဆောင်း မယ်တော်)
30. Pareinma Shin Mingaung (ပရိမ္မရှင် မင်းခေါင်)
31. Min Sithu (မင်းစည်သူ)
32. Min Kyawzwa (မင်းကျော်စွာ)
33. Myaukhpet Shinma (မြောက်ဘက်ရှင်မ)
34. Anauk Mibaya (အနောက် မိဘုရား)
35. Shingon (ရှင်ကုန်း)
36. Shingwa (ရှင်ကွ)
37. Shin Nemi (ရှင်နဲမိ)

== See also ==
- Deva (Buddhism)
- Hungry ghost
- Lên đồng
- Preta
