= Thonbanhla =

Burmese nat (deity)

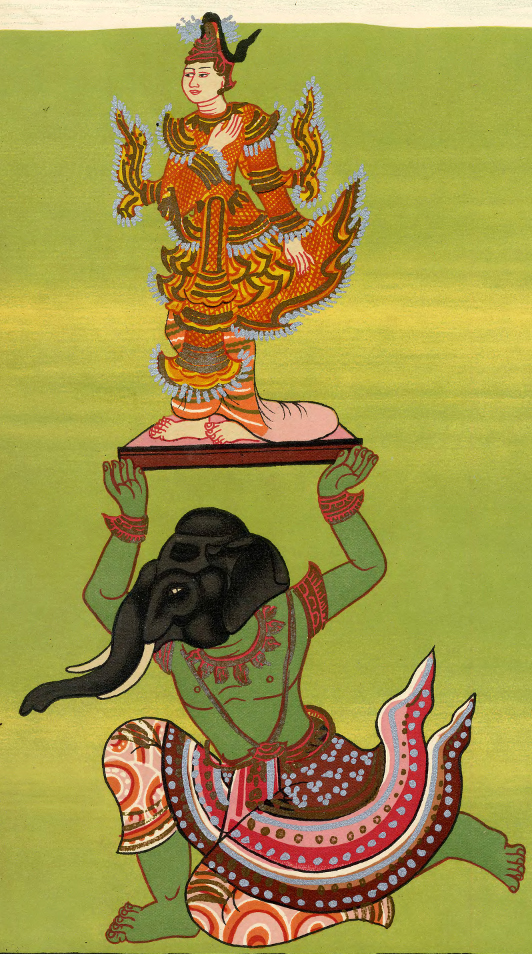
Thonbanhla Nat

Thonbanhla (Burmese: သုံးပန်လှ, [θóʊɰ̃ báɰ̃ l̥a̰]; lit. 'Beautiful in Three Ways') is the fifth of the official 37 nats in the Burmese pantheon. She is often associated with extraordinary beauty, tragedy, and divine transformation.

According to legend, Thonbanhla was the younger sister of the nat Maung Tint De (also known as Maung Tintala). After her family was involved in a dispute, she fled to Rakhine, where the Rakhine king adopted her as his daughter. Later, she married King Smim Htaw Yama of Utthala and gave birth to a daughter, Shin Mi-hnè. On a journey to Tagaung to visit relatives, she fell ill and died at Tapa Taung Ri, west of Inwa, and was then deified.

Some legends state that after her death, her daughter Shin Nemi (also called Shinnae Mi) missed her so deeply that she too died as a child in Daung Ri village, becoming a nat herself.

== Depiction ==
Thonbanhla is typically portrayed standing atop an ogre who bends over a dais supported by an elephant. Her hair is braided into a topknot. She places her right hand on her chest and lets her left arm fall gracefully by her side. In some depictions, she stands on a giant elephant-shaped seat, with a detailed headdress and ornamental features symbolizing her nobility and sorrow.
