= Thandawgan =

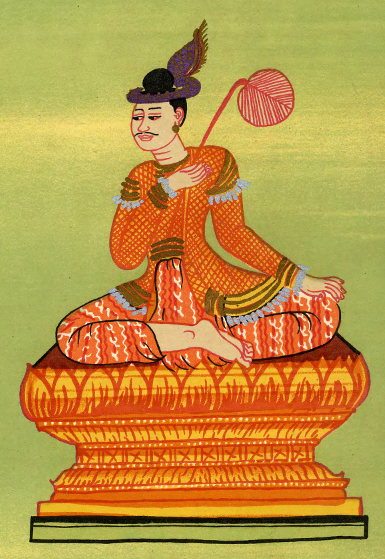
Thandawgan nat

Thandawgan (Burmese: သံတော်ခံ, pronounced [θàɰ̃dɔ̀ɡàɰ̃]; lit. 'receiver of the royal voice') is one of the 37 nats in the official pantheon of Burmese nats. The nat is a representation of historical Yè Thiha, a royal messenger of Minkhaung II, the viceroy of Taungoo and brother of King Bayinnaung. According to the belief, Ye Thiha went to the forest to gather flowers, contracted malaria, and died. He is portrayed sitting on a lotus pedestal holding a fan in his right hand and his left hand resting on his knee.
