= Mandalay Bodaw =

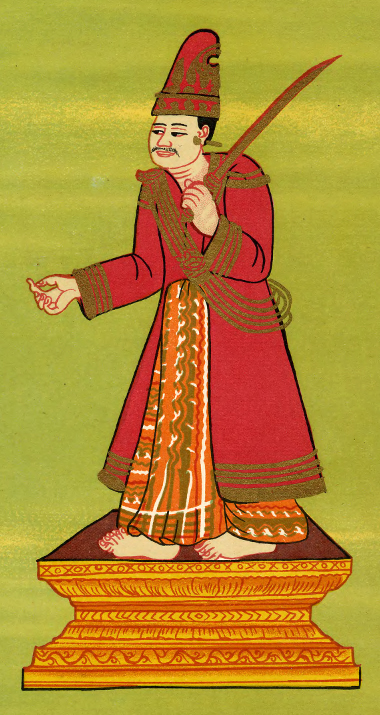
Mandalay Bodaw nat

Mandalay Bodaw (Burmese: မန္တလေးဘိုးတော်, pronounced [màɰ̃dəlé bódɔ̀]; lit. 'Lord Grandfather of Mandalay') is one of the 37 nats in the official pantheon of Burmese nats. The son of King Pallikara, possibly of the Pala dynasty of Bengal and brother of Shingwa, one of the 37 nats. He was Ponna descent who had tended, taught and looked after Shwe Hpyin Nyi Naung brothers is their boyhood. During King Anawrahta’s reign he became a minister. In fact Shwe Hpyin Nyidaw and Shwe Hpyin Naungdaw being fatally punished happened to be primarily because the guardian minister's way of teaching, tending and upbringing were merely wrong and defective for which he was fully responsible, teaching false lesson is a punishable offence. Getting wind of taking action against him the old man Bo Daw tried to run away with his elephant was caught red-handed just before absconding. The penalty inflicted on him was death, thus immediately after execution he became a Nat of Mandalay Bodaw. He is portrayed standing on a pedestal with a sword on his shoulder and a hand raised, pointing his finger.
