= Nyaunggyin =

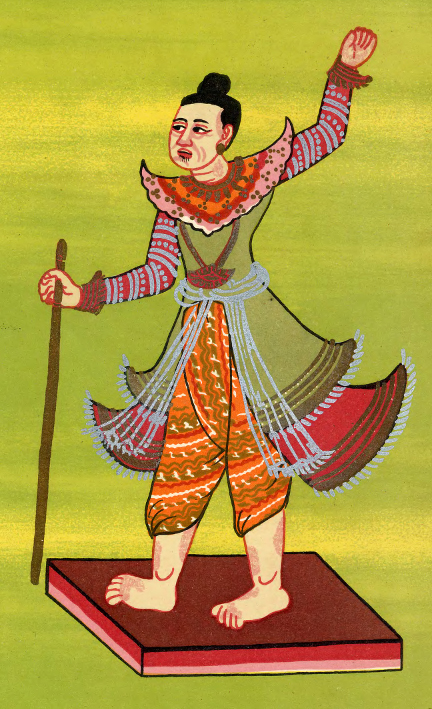
Nyaunggyin Nat

Nyaunggyin (Burmese: ညောင်ချင်း [ɲàʊɰ̃dʑɪ́ɰ̃]) is one of the 37 nats in the Burmese pantheon of nats. He was a descendant of the captive King Manuha of Thaton. He died of leprosy during the reign of King Anawrahta of Pagan. He is portrayed standing on a pedestal with a topknot, his left hand raised and holding a staff in his right.
