= Htibyuhsaung Medaw =

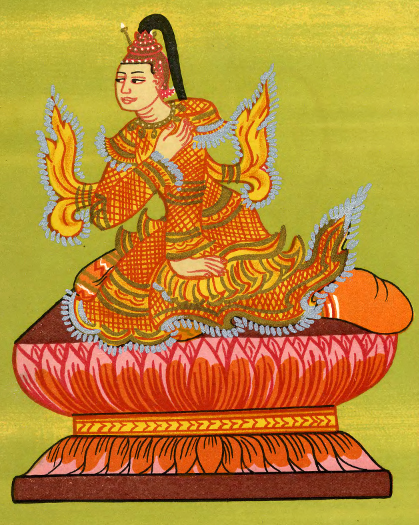
Htibyuhsaung Medaw Nat

Htibyuhsaung Medaw (ထီးဖြူဆောင်းမယ်တော် [tʰí bjù sʰáʊɰ̃ mɛ̀dɔ̀]; lit. 'Royal Mother of Htibyuhsaung'), is one of the 37 nats in the Burmese pantheon of nats. She was the grandmother of King Anawrahta of Pagan and died of illness. She is portrayed with hair knotted and dangling, sitting on folded knees with a hand on her lap.
