= Medaw Shwezaga =

Mother of Shwe Sitthin in Burmese folk religion

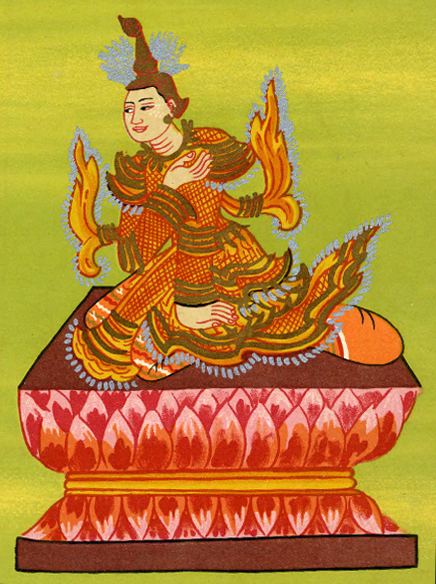
Medaw Shwezaga Nat

Medaw Shwezaga (Burmese: မယ်တော် ရွှေစကား, pronounced [mɛ̀dɔ̀ ʃwè zəɡá]) is one of the 37 nats in the Burmese pantheon of nats. She was one of queens consort of the King Saw Khin Hnit, one of the last kings of the Early Bagan Kingdom. The mother of Shwe Sitthin, she died of heartbreak over the sorrowful plight of her son. She is portrayed sitting on a pedestal with her right hand on her bosom and her left hand resting on her lap.
