= Myaukhpet Shinma =

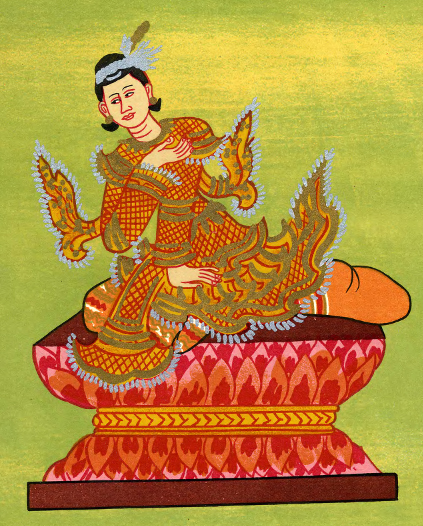
Myaukhpet Shinma

Myaukhpet Shinma (Burmese: မြောက်ဘက်ရှင်မ [mjaʊʔpʰɛʔ ʃɪ̀ɰ̃ma̰]; lit. 'Lady of the North') of the 37 nats in the Burmese pantheon of nats. She is the nat representation of the wet nurse of King Tabinshwehti, and a native of North Kadu. She died in childbirth. The Lady of the North is often depicted on her knees (or alternatively reclining on a throne), right hand on her bosom, left hand on her knee and wearing royal robes. Though she is mostly portrayed as a young woman, she can sometimes be seen in her elderly form.
