= Taungmagyi =

One of the Thirty Seven Nats

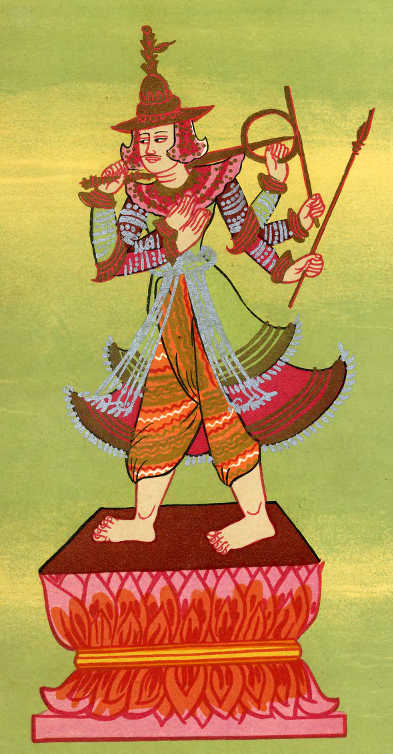
Taungmagyi Nat

Taungmagyi (Burmese: တောင်မကြီး, lit. 'Lord of the South', also known as Shin Nyo (ရှင်ညို) is one of 37 nats in the official Burmese pantheon of nats. He is one of two sons of Maung Tint De (Mahagiri Nat) and Shwe Nabay. The King he and his brother were serving under became fearful of their strength and forced them to fight each other to death.
