= Shindaw =

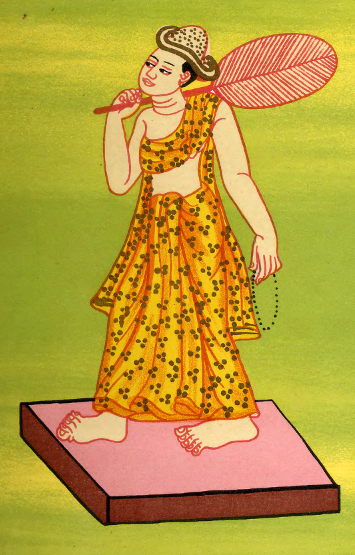
Shindaw Nat

Shindaw (Burmese: ရှင်တော်, pronounced [ʃɪ̀ɰ̃dɔ̀]) was one of the 37 nats in the Burmese pantheon of nats. He was a young novice monk of Innwa and died of a snake bite. He is portrayed standing on a pedestal with headwear, and a yellow robe. He holds a fan in his right hand and rosary beads in his left.
