= Shingwa =

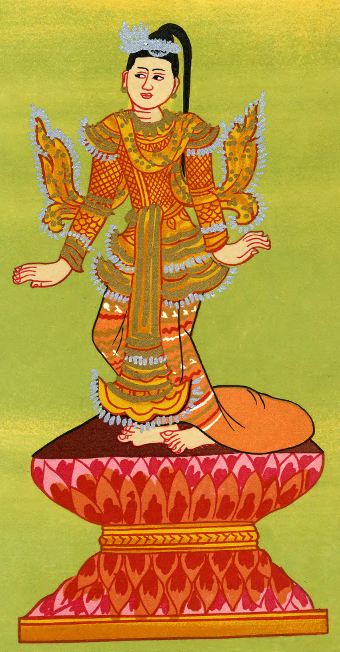
Shingwa Nat

Shingwa (Burmese: ရှင်ကွ, pronounced [ʃɪ̀ɰ̃ ɡwa̰]; lit. 'Lady Bandy Legs') is one of 37 nats in the official Burmese pantheon of nats. She was the sister of Mandalay Bodaw, one of the 37 nats, and killed together with her brother for hiding the brothers Shwe Hpyin Nyidaw and Shwe Hpyin Naungdaw. The daughter of King Pallikara, possibly of the Pala dynasty of Bengal.
