= Thagyamin =

Burmese Buddhist deity

- King of the Gods; God of Lightning, Thunder, and Rain; King of Heaven
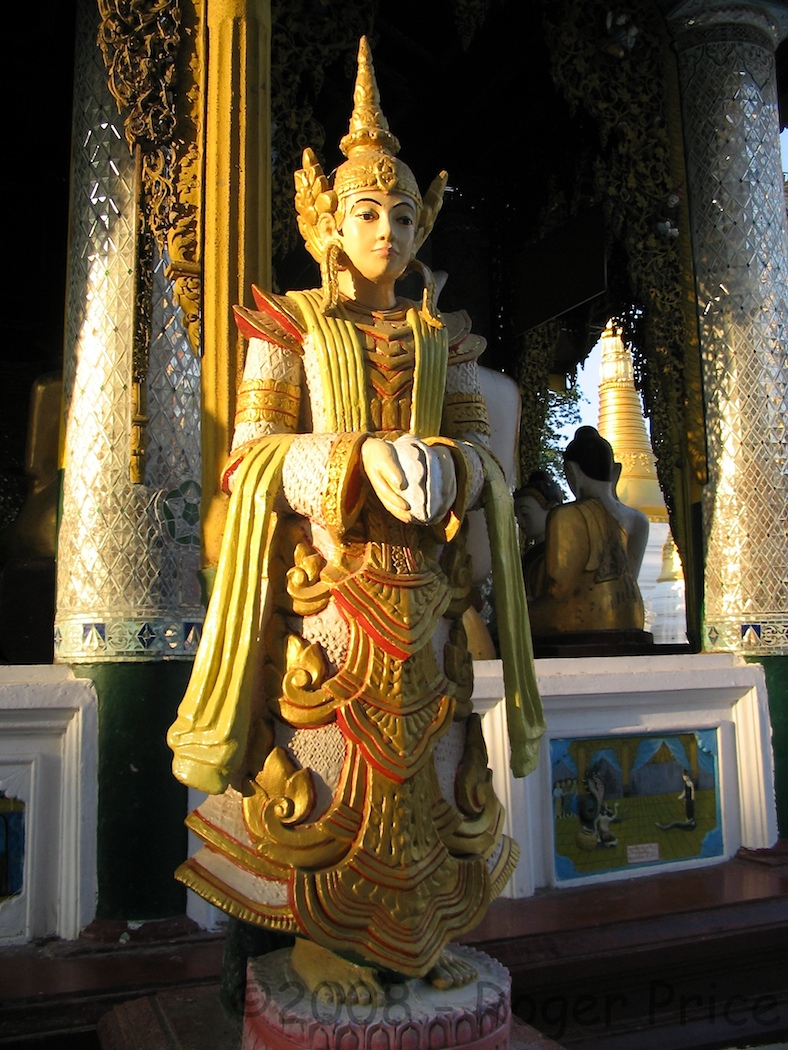
- Thagyamin at the Shwedagon Pagoda
- Sanskrit transliteration: Shakra
- Affiliation: deva, nat, Buddhism in Myanmar, Burmese folk religion
- Abode: Amarāvati, the capital of Indraloka (Indra's world) in Svarga, Trāyastriṃśa (Heaven of the 33), Mount Meru
- Weapon: Vajra (Thunderbolt), Astras, Vasavi Shakthi
- Symbols: Vajra, Indra's net
- Mount: Airavata (White elephant), Uchchaihshravas (White horse)
- Texts: deva, nat, Buddhism in Myanmar, Burmese folk religion, Jātakas, Epics
- Consort: Sujā

Equivalents
- Greek: Zeus
- Norse: Thor
- Roman: Jupiter
- Slavic: Perun

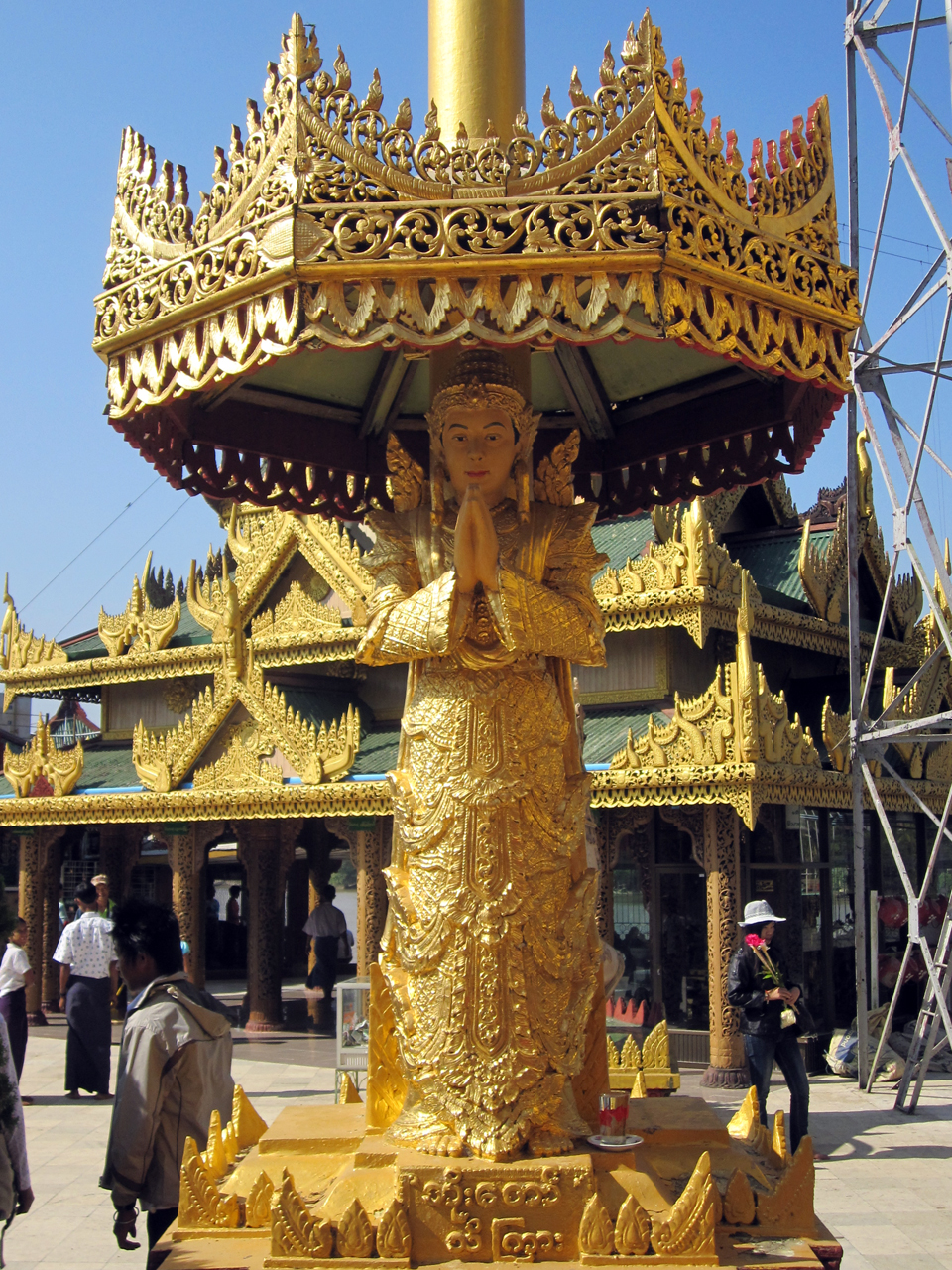
A statue of Thagyamin at the Kyauktan Yay-Le Pagoda.

Thagyamin (Burmese: သိကြားမင်း, pronounced [ðədʑámɪ́ɰ̃]; from Sanskrit ၐကြ, Śakra) is the highest-ranking nat (deity) in traditional Burmese Buddhist belief. Considered as the king of Heaven, he is the Burmese adaptation of the Hindu deity Indra.

== Etymology ==
Thagyamin (သိကြားမင်း) is derived from the combination of the Sanskrit word "Shakra" (शक्र; a synonym of Indra) and the Burmese word "Min" (မင်း; a common title meaning Lord/King). He is also known by his nickname ''U Magha'' (ဦးမာဃ) derived from his preexistential name.

== Description ==
Thagyamin (also known as Śakra or Indra) is a prominent deity in Burmese Buddhist mythology and folk religion. He is often portrayed holding a conch shell in one hand and a yak-tail fly-whisk in the other, standing or seated atop a three-headed white elephant (Airavata). Thagyamin is regarded as the ruler of the celestial kingdom Trāyastriṃśa (တာဝတိံသာ).

He was designated as the supreme deity among the official pantheon of 37 ahtet nat (အထက်နတ်, "upper deities") by King Anawrahta of Bagan in the 11th century. This move was part of Anawrahta's effort to harmonize pre-Buddhist animist and Hindu traditions with emerging Theravāda Buddhism in Burma. Notably, Thagyamin is the only nat in the official pantheon who did not die a "raw death" (အစိမ်းသေ), a sudden or violent demise, which is typical of other nats.

== Panḍukambala Rock Throne ==
According to Burmese Buddhist mythology, when the future Buddha Metteyya was the prince Mahāpanāda (မာဃလုလင်), he planted and donated a bodhi tree near the Sudhamma Hall in Tāvatiṃsa. He also consecrated a great slab of stone beneath it. As a result of that meritorious deed, the divine Paññḍukambala Rock Throne (ပဏ္ဍုကမ္ဗလာမြကျောက်ဖျာ) later arose in the Trāyastriṃśa heaven.

=== Location ===
It is located in the great Pundarika Park to the northeast of the capital city of the Trāyastriṃśa heaven, called Mahāsudassana, near the great Bodhi tree.

=== Dimensions ===
The throne is sixty yojanas long, fifty yojanas wide, and fifteen yojanas thick. Its color is described as a deep reddish hue, similar to the blossom of a red lotus (လက်ခေါင်ရန်းပွင့်).

=== Phenomena and Heating ===
Under normal conditions, the rock throne remains cool. However, when extraordinary or morally significant events are imminent, it becomes tense and heats up. Such conditions include:

- The need to assist virtuous beings and righteous individuals;
- The approaching death of King Thagyamin (Śakra);
- The arising of highly virtuous individuals who could potentially replace him.

When such heating occurs, Thagyamin discerns the cause and addresses the situation. It was upon this sacred throne that the Buddha preached the Abhidhamma discourse during his stay in Tāvatiṃsa.

== Thingyan Legend ==
According to Burmese folklore, Thagyamin visits the human world each year on the first day of Thingyan, the traditional Burmese New Year. Though invisible, he observes the conduct of mortals: names of virtuous people are recorded in a golden book, while names of wrongdoers are inscribed in a book made from dog-skin leather. On the third day of Thingyan, he returns to the heavenly realm.

== Celestial Vehicles ==
When traveling, Thagyamin most frequently rides the Vejayantā Celestial Chariot. On special occasions, he rides the elephant Airāvaṇa.

=== Vejayantā Celestial Chariot ===
The Vejayantā chariot is driven by the divine charioteer Mātali. The chariot spans a length of 150 yojanas from front to back. At its center lies a grand jeweled platform for Thagyamin to be seated upon. The chariot has only one yoke, which is harnessed with a thousand divine horses known as Ājānīya. These celestial horses are renowned for their speed and elegance.

=== Royal Elephant Airāvaṇa ===
The celestial being known as Airāvaṇa (ဧရာဝဏ်) assumes the form of an elephant for Thagyamin to ride when visiting his divine garden. Airāvaṇa was originally a deva, who in a previous life had been a great elephant gifted to King Māgha. In the celestial realms, actual animals do not exist, as this is not customary. Upon Thagyamin's return from the garden, the elephant reverts to his original divine form.

== The Seven Virtues of the Deva King ==
The future Deva King (Thagyamin), the Māgha youth, not only performed meritorious deeds such as building resting places and roads for travelers, but also practiced the following seven noble virtues:

1. Honoring and caring for one's parents with utmost respect, valuing them more than one’s own life.

2. Respecting elders among one's relatives from both maternal and paternal sides who are older than oneself.

3. Speaking in a sweet and refined manner that reflects deep respect.

4. Avoiding slander or divisive speech that could cause separation between loving individuals.

5. Giving freely and generously without selfishness or hesitation, regardless of time or convenience.

6. Always speaking the truth, with integrity and honesty.

7. Controlling one's anger, never allowing wrath to surface. If anger does arise, quickly letting it go and forgiving.

Because of the wholesome karma of practicing such noble conduct not only for future existences but also for this very life, he became a Deva King in the heavenly realm. His 32 companions were also reborn as guardian devas who serve and protect the Deva King.

== Gallery ==
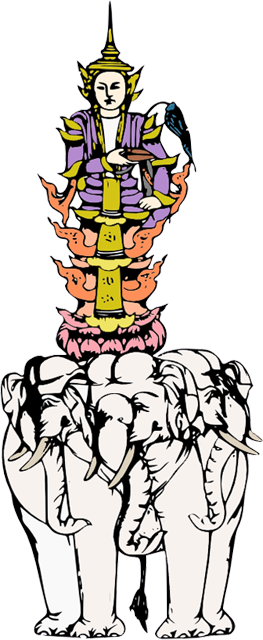
A portrayal of the King of gods, Thagyamin

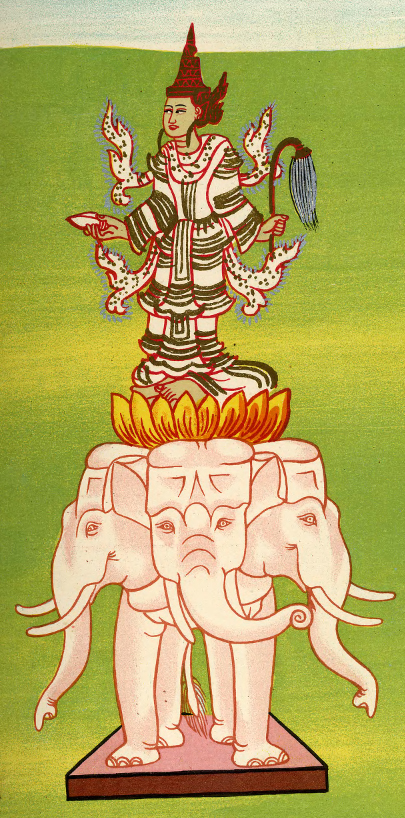

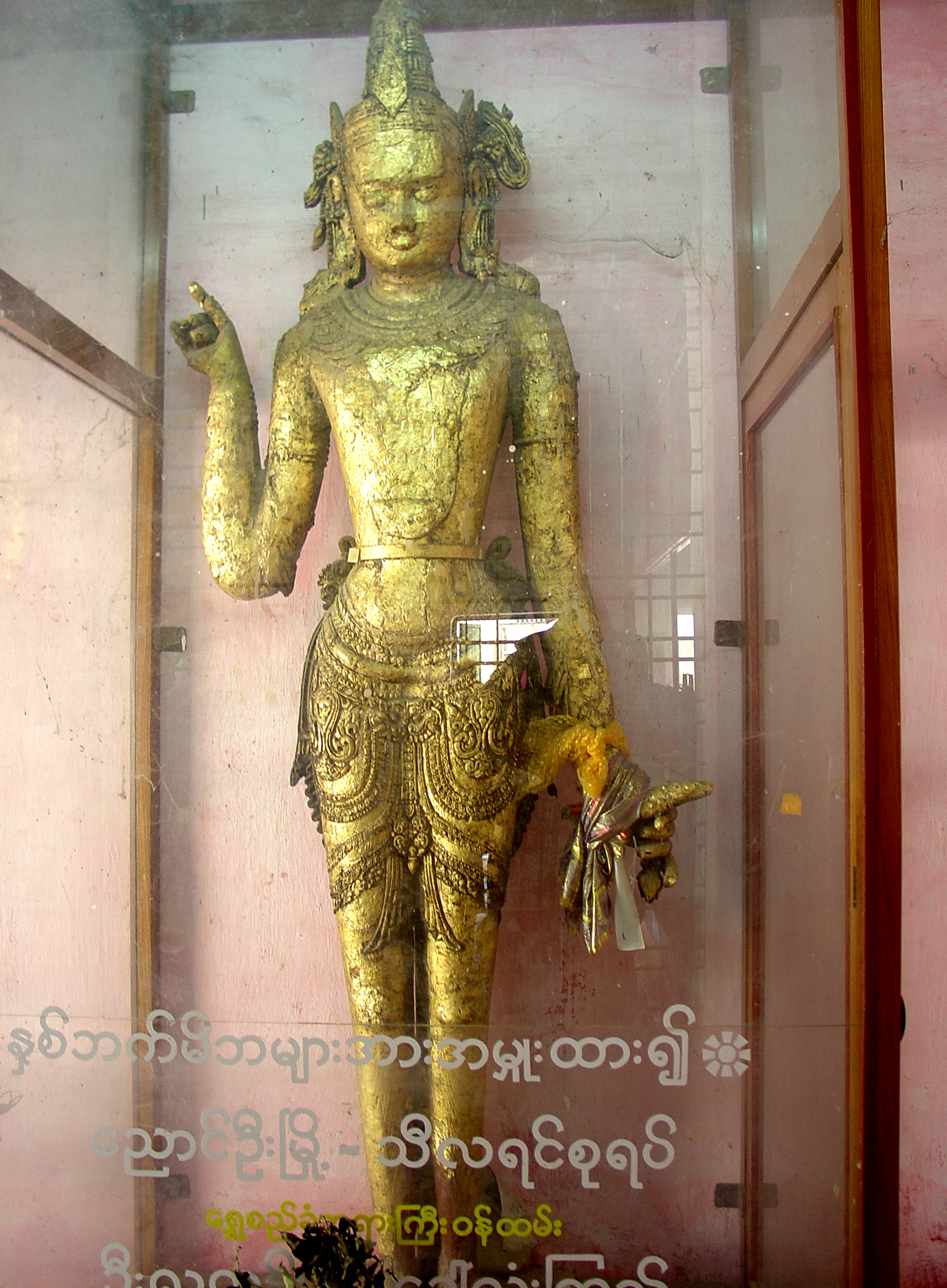
The sculpture of Thagyamin in position of chief of nat in Shwezigon Pagoda in Pagan Kingdom.

== See also ==
Counterparts of Thagyamin in other Asian cultures

- Haneullim, the Korean counterpart
- Indra, the Hindu counterpart
- Jade Emperor, the Chinese and Taoist counterpart
- Śakra, the Buddhist counterpart
- Ulgen/Qormusta Tengri, the Turko-Mongolian counterpart
