= Shwe Nabay =

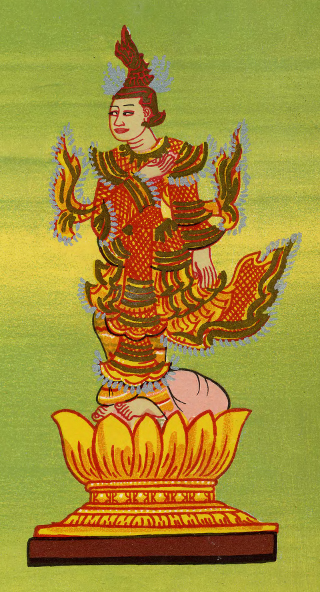
Shwe Nabay Nat

Shwenabay (Burmese: ရွှေနံဘေး), also known as Shwe Nabe Nat or Naga Medaw (နဂါးမယ်တော်), is one of the 37 official nats in the Burmese pantheon of spirits. According to popular beliefs, she was a beautiful woman from Mindon City, located west of Sarat City, who married a Naga spirit. One account states that after consummating her marriage with the Naga, she died of a heart attack. Another version claims that she died of a broken heart after her husband deserted her.

Some stories describe her as the wife of Maung Tint De, the king of the house of Panbe. They had two sons: North King Shin Phyu and Taung Maung Shin Nyo. It is said that when she heard news that Maung Tint De was killed by King Tagaung, she became a nat (spirit).

In a different version of the tale, Shwe Napae is described as a naga herself, who ran together with her brother Tintala. She laid two eggs and died shortly afterward. Another variant claims she died spontaneously after having sexual relations with a forest youth, who then fled the scene.

The image of the deity is typically portrayed standing on a lotus seat, wearing a Naga headdress, with her right hand on her chest and her left hand by her side. Some iconography includes a dragon's head on her headdress, a serpentine neck, and a thorned tail.

Shwe Nabe Nat has been venerated in Mindon since the Sri Kshetra era. Her shrine is located at Popa Taung, a key spiritual site in central Myanmar.
