= Mintha Maungshin =

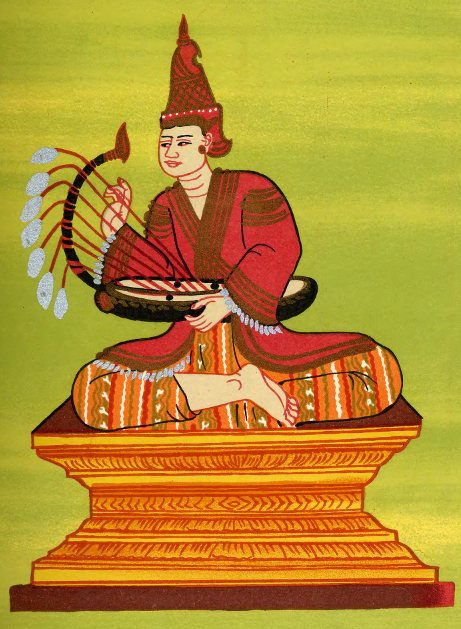
Mintha Maungshin nat

Mintha Maungshin (Burmese: မင်းသားမောင်ရှင် [mɪ́ɰ̃ðá màʊɰ̃ ʃɪ̀ɰ̃]), is one of 37 recognized in the Burmese pantheon of nats. He was a grandson of King Alaungsithu of Pagan (Bagan), son of Min Shin Saw. While he was still a young novice monk (samanera), he fell off a swing and died.
