= Minye Aungdin =

Nat in Burmese folk religion

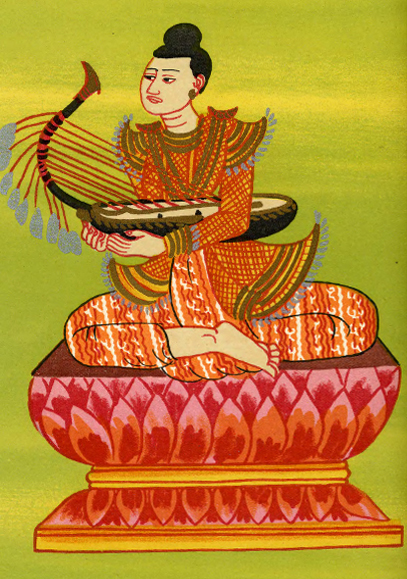
Minye Aungdin Nat

Minyè Aungdin (Burmese: မင်းရဲအောင်တင် [mɪ́ɰ̃jɛ́ àʊɰ̃dɪ̀ɰ̃]), husband of Princess Shwe Sin Tu, daughter of King Thalun and his queen, who was daughter of Sawbwa of Monè in Shan State. He died from an excess of opium smoking. He is portrayed sitting on a pedestal with a topknot and holding a harp.
