= Islam in Myanmar =

Burmese Muslims မြန်မာနိုင်ငံရှိ အစ္စလာမ်ဘာသာဝင်များ
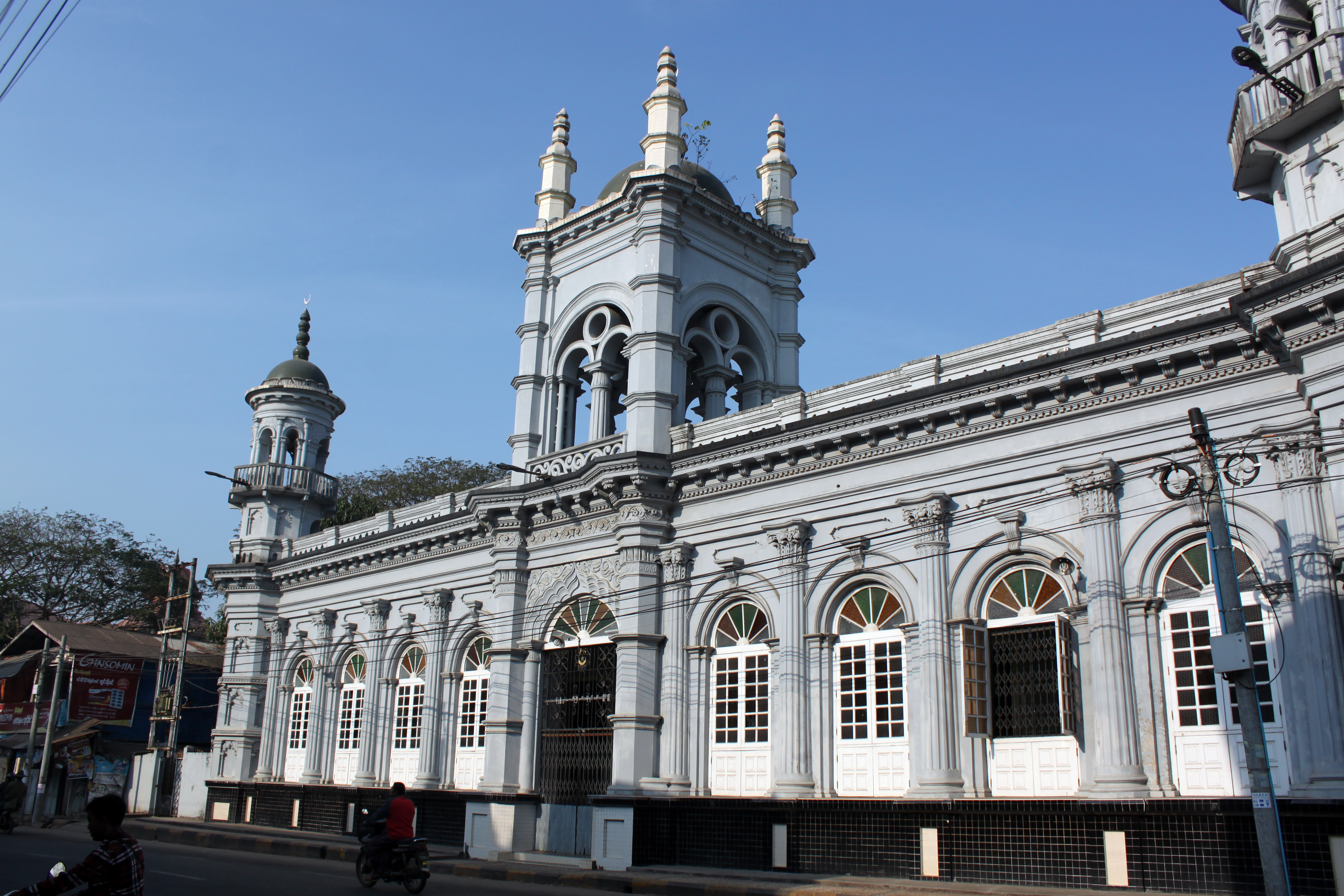
- Kaladan Mosque in Mawlamyine, Mon State

Total population
- 1,349,980 (0.3%) (2026) ▼

Languages
- Burmese • Arabic

Related ethnic groups
- Panthay, Burmese Indians, Bengali, Kamein

Islam is a minority religion in Myanmar, practised by about 3.3% of the population, according to the 2024 Myanmar official statistics.

== Demographics ==
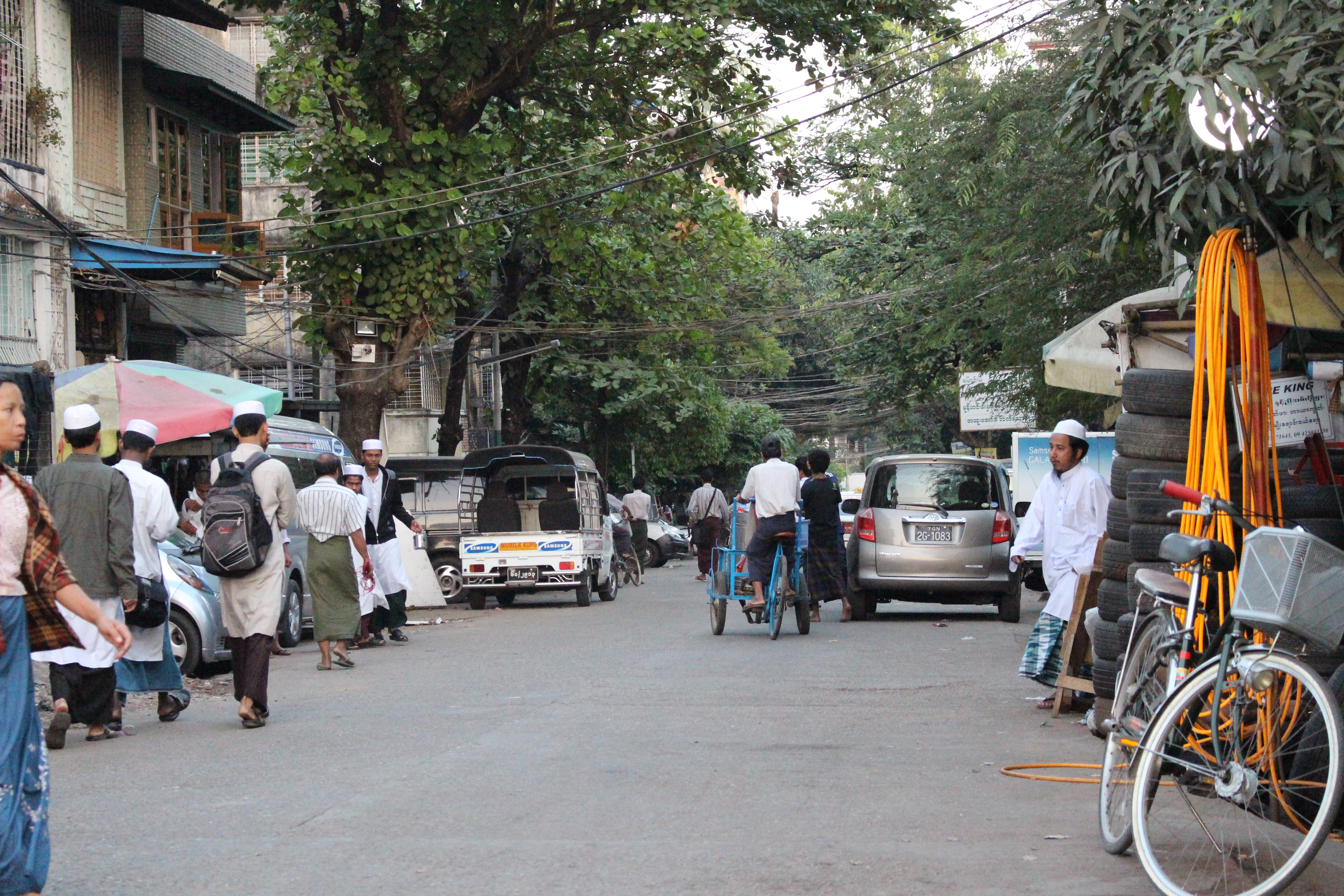
Muslim Men in Yangon

Islam, mainly of the Sunni denomination, is practised by 3.3% of the population of Burma according to the government census latest 2024 year.

According to the US State Department's 2006 international religious freedom report, the country's non-Buddhist populations were underestimated in the census. Muslim leaders estimate that 10% of the population may be Muslim, though estimates are before the Rohingya refugee crisis.

=== Burmese Muslim groups ===
- Panthays, Chinese Muslims in Burma migrated from Yunnan Province of China.
- Burmese Malays in Tanintharyi. Burmese people of Malay ancestry are locally called Pashu regardless of religion.
- Bamar Muslims (historically known as Zerbadi Muslims) are a community descended from inter-ethnic marriages between Indian Muslim males and Burmese females. They are the largest Muslim group in Myanmar and form more than half of the total Muslim population in the country. Culturally, Bamar Muslims are the same as the Bamar Buddhists including their lifestyle, clothing and language.
- Kamein, a government-recognized ethnic minority native to Rakhine state and one of the seven groups of the Rakhine nation.
- Rohingyas, a minority Muslim ethnic group in northern Rakhine State, Myanmar. The Rohingya population is mostly concentrated in five northern townships of Rakhine State: Maungdaw, Buthidaung, Rathedaung, Akyab, Sandway, Tongo, Shokepro, Rashong Island and Kyauktaw.

==== Pathi and Panthays ====
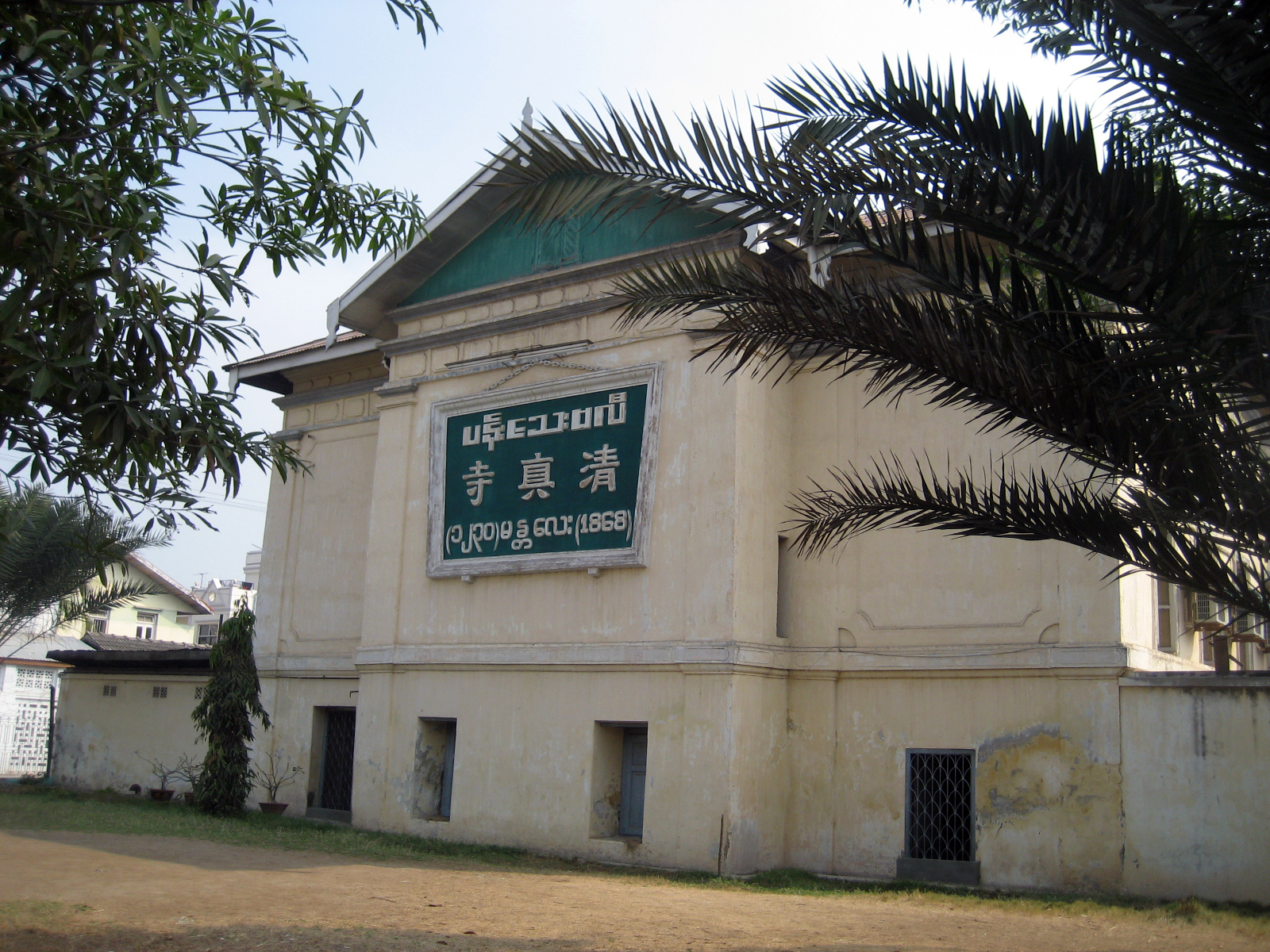
A Panthay Mosque in Mandalay

Myanmar Muslims were sometimes called Pathi, and Chinese Muslims are called Panthay. Native Burmese Muslim Converts were sometimes called Pathi, a name believed to be derived as a distortion of the Persian word "Parsi". Many settlements in the southern region of Myanmar were noted for their Muslim populations. There is some assumption amongst Pathi that the city of Pathein is named after its high Pathi population. Some also trace it a purported Muslim Indian king who ruled the city in the 13th century. However, etymologists typically trace the name to Old Mon "Kusimanagara" shortened to "Kuthen" from the Kalyani Inscriptions. And coincidentally, Pathein is still famous for Pathein halawa, a traditional Myanmar snack inherited from northern Indian Muslim related to halwa.

Persian Muslims arrived in northern Burma on the border with the Chinese region of Yunnan as recorded in the Chronicles of China in 860 AD. Burma's contacts with Islam via Yunnan go back to Nasiruddin, the commander of the first Mongol invasion of Burma in 1277. In the 19th century, the broadminded King Mindon of Mandalay permitted the Chinese Muslims known as Panthays to build a mosque in Mandalay. The mosque received donations from Sultan Du Wenxiu of the Pingnan Sultanate in Yunnan and was supervised by one of his colonels. It signifies the beginning of the first Panthay Jama'at (Congregation) in the Mandalay Empire.

==== Rohingya people ====
Around 800,000 Muslim Rohingyas live in Burma with around 80% living in Rakhine State. The Military of Myanmar has been killing and driving the Rohingyas out of the country as part of their on and off attempt since the 1940s to create a Muslim-free land in Western Burma.

In the 1970s, uprisings appeared again during the period of the Bangladesh Liberation War in 1971. Recently, groups in the area, according to various media reports, aimed to create northern part of Rakhine State as an independent or autonomous state.

Successive governments, both democratic and military, did not grant the citizenship of the Muslim Rohingya people of Northern Rakhine state. Their claim to citizenship has been marred by disputes with the ethnic Arakanese, who are mainly Buddhists. In 2017, the military carried out a crackdown on Rohingya people in Rakhine State; in 2022, the US Secretary of State determined that members of the Burmese military had committed genocide and crimes against humanity against the Rohingya people.+ An estimated 1.6 million Rohingya have fled to Bangladesh, Thailand and India; by the end of 2022, the UNHCR reported that approximately 148,000 Rohingya were being held in displacement camps in the country.

=== Islam by state ===
The 2014 Population and Housing Census Report gives the following statistics of Muslims in Myanmar.

State	Population	Islam (2014 Census)	% of State Population
Ayeyawady	6,184,829	84,073	1.4%
Bago	4,867,373	56,753	1.2%
Chin State	478,801	690	0.1%
Kachin State	1,642,841	26,789	1.6%
Kayah State	286,627	3,197	1.1%
Kayin State	1,504,326	68,459	4.3%
Magway	3,917,055	12,311	0.3%
Mandalay	6,165,723	187,785	3.0%
Mon State	2,054,393	119,086	5.8%
Naypyidaw	1,160,242	24,030	2.1%
Rakhine State	2,098,807	1,118,731	35.1%
Sagaing	5,325,347	58,987	1.1%
Shan State	5,824,432	58,918	1.0%
Tanintharyi	1,408,401	71,828	5.1%
Yangon	7,360,703	345,612	4.7%
Myanmar	50,279,900	3,172,479	4.3%

== History ==
The first Muslims in Myanmar date to early Arab Muslim merchants in the Bagan period. Early settlements and propagation of Islam is documented to the 9th century. The First Mongol invasion of Burma in the 13th century and the relationship of the Mrauk U Kingdom with the Bengal Sultanate are examples of prominent Muslim presence in Myanmar with Muslims ranging from traders and settlers to positions of status as royal advisors and port authorities. The Pathi and Panthay ethnic groups also form a historically significant group of precolonial Chinese Muslims in Myanmar. In addition, British rule in Burma brought several Muslim diasporic immigrants, including Indian Muslims who became a significant population in Rangoon.

The core of the Burmese Muslim community today are the descendants of Muslim peoples who settled and intermarried with local Burmese ethnic groups. Muslims arrived in Burma as traders or settlers, military personnel, and prisoners of war, refugees, and as slaves. However, many early Muslims also held positions of status as royal advisers, royal administrators, port authorities, mayors, and traditional medicine men. Burmese kings resettled Muslims as prisoners of war throughout history as they did with other ethnic groups. Muslim artillerymen, riflemen and royal bodyguards served regularly in Burmese army during the Konbaung dynasty.

The colonial period saw substantial immigration of Burmese Indians, many of them Muslim. Various riots and dissatisfaction with the socioeconomic conditions under British rule in Burma led to increased anti-Muslim sentiment. Muslims sought representation and citizenship during independence, but faced significant opposition. In the 1960s, all Muslims were increasingly seen as foreign elements unwelcome in the country.

During the State Peace and Development Council junta rule, anti-Muslim riots became increasingly common. Anti-Muslim pamphlets were widely distributed and vengeful Buddhist mobs formed to reports of alleged Muslims raping Buddhist women in 1997, 2001, 2012, 2013 and 2014. In 2005, the Ministry of Religious Affairs cited the various examples of Muslims and Christians throughout Myanmar's royal history and the loving kindness of Burmese culture to declare freedom of religion for all. issued a declaration concerning freedom of religion

In 2015, anti-Muslims sentiment focused increasingly on the Rohingya people in northern Rakhine State. Starting in 2016, persecution targeting the Rohingya grew leading to a crackdown with extrajudicial killings and other human rights abuses and brutalities. In 2017, this was followed up by the Rohingya genocide, where a military operation killed thousands and drove out hundreds of thousands of Rohingya people into Bangladesh.

=== Bagan period ===
In the early Bagan era (652–660 AD), Arab chronicles document merchants landing at ports such as Thaton and Martaban while sailing from Madagascar to China. Arab travellers visited the Andaman Islands in the Bay of Bengal south of Burma.

The first Muslims landed in Myanmar's Irrawaddy delta and on the Tanintharyi coast. By the 9th century, they were also present in Arakan, prior to the establishment of the first Burmese empire in 1055 AD by King Anawrahta of Bagan. The sea ports of Burma are rife with the legendary accounts of early shipwrecks in their vicinity, which are supported by archaeological remnants. However, long-term settlement by Muslim traders appear to date to later centuries following the First Mongol invasion of Burma.

==== Deified Muslim figures ====
In Burma's semi-historical traditional historical chronicle, the Hmannan Yazawin, two Kalar Muslim sailor brothers, Byat Wi and Byat Ta, arrived near Thaton in the 11th century. Kalar today is an ethnic slur for Indians and Arabs, but originally meant "dark-skinned" and is assumed to have meant that they were from India. According to the chronicle, they gained superhuman strength after eating the magic meat of a mystic. The king of Thaton became afraid of them and killed the elder brother. The younger brother, Byatta, escaped to Bagan and took refuge with king Anawratha. He met and married Me Wunna from Mount Popa and had two sons- the Shwe Hpyin brothers.

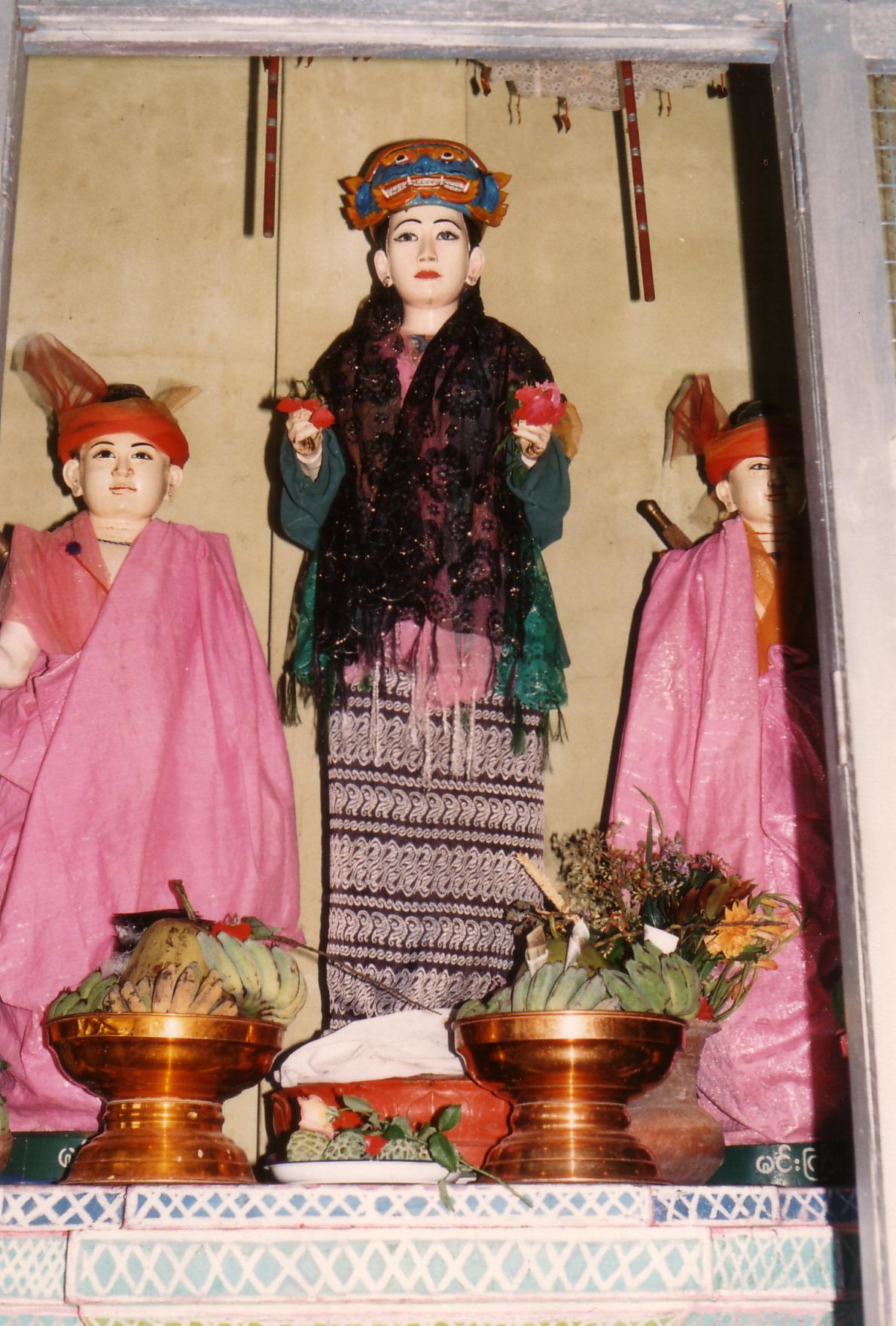
A shrine to the Shwe Hypin brothers and their mother Me Wunna at Mount Popa

The Shwe Hpyin brothers served the Bagan king as warriors. They became famous for infiltrating the Chinese King of Gandalaraj Utibua's bodyguards to draw three lines with white lime on the king's body and write a threatening message on the wall, scaring the Chinese into peace. However, the brothers were eventually executed because they refused to contribute in the building of a pagoda in Taungbyon, There was dissatisfaction with the decision and, according to legend, the two brothers' spirit manifested and demanded possession of Taungbyon. They were then deified as two of the 37 Great Nats, the Burmese pantheon.

The brothers are the subject of Myanmar's largest Nat festival- the Taungbyone Festival, celebrated annually for six days. Worshippers avoid consumption of pork out of respect for their religion as Muslims.

==== Traders in Lower Burma ====
When King Anawrahta attacked Martaban, the capital of the Thaton Kingdom in the 12th century, their king Manuha was recorded to have two Muslim officers who commanded the defence fiercely.

Early Muslim settlements the propagation of Islam between the 9th and 14th century were documented by Arab, Persian, European and Chinese travellers. The majority of these were trade colonies in Lower Burma, with Muslim traders primarily referring to Pegu as "Burma". Later, during the Bagan king Kyansittha would take Indians captive during his invasions of Lower Burma, starting some of the first Muslims settlements in Upper Burma.

At first Muslims arrived on the Arakan coast and moved into the upward hinterland to Maungdaw. The time when the Muslims arrived in Burma and in Arakan and Maungdaw is uncertain.

=== Mrauk U Kingdom ===
The Kingdom of Ava attacked Arakan in 1404, ousting the Arakin king Narameikhla to Bengal in the court of the Sultan of Gayr. He was reinstated as King of Arakan with the military assistance of the Sultan. Narameikhla founded the new capital, Mrauk U and the Mrauk U Kingdom. The Muslim army who helped him retake the kingdom settled in Arakan and built the Sandi Khan mosque in the village of Kawalaung. According to the Arakanese Rakhine Razawin Thit chronicle, Narameikhla had to surrender the twelve towns of Bhanga (Bengal) to the Sultan of Bengal and agree to be feudatory to Bengal in order to gain support. Arakan thus remained to be a subject state of Bengal for a century (1430–1530); Bengal Sultans conferred Muslim titles to nine kings of Arakan during this period.

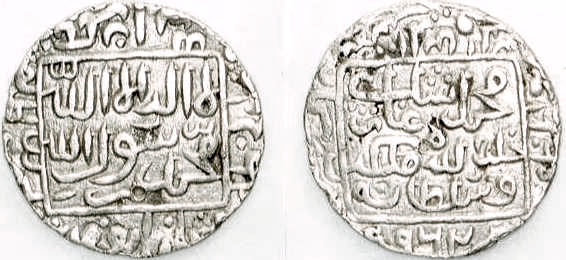
Arakanese coin from 1554 bearing the kalimah

Coins bearing the kalimah Islamic confession of faith and the name of the four khalifs of Islam in Arabic were discovered from this period of Arakan. Even after Mrauk U's independence from Bengal, many of its kings continued to style themselves as sultans. The son of Mughal Emperor Shah Jahan, prince Shah Shuja, fled to Arakan in 1660 being granted asylum from his brother Aurangzeb after a failed rebellion. His soldiers' descendants became the Muslim Kamein people, forming the Royal Archers of the Guard. After the death of Arakanese king Sanda Thudhamma in 1684, the Kamein became very powerful power brokers in the Arakan court, dominating it from 1684 to 1710.

=== Taungoo period ===
When Tabinshwehti, the first Taungoo king (1530–1550 AD) attacked Hanthawaddy, Muslim soldiers were recorded as helping the Mons with artillery. When Tabinshwehti attacked Martaban in 1541 AD, many Muslims resisted strongly. When Bayinnaung successfully conquered Ayutthaya a decade later, he used Muslim artillerymen.

In the chronicles of Malaysia, during the first Malacca Empire of Parameswara in the early 15th century, it was recorded that when Burmese traders and sailors traded in Malacca. Muslim workers regularly travelled to Burma.

From the fifteenth to seventeenth Centuries, Muslim traders faced strict regulations by Burmese kings and, mostly, by local governors. However the ports thrived as an important point for sea communication, supplies and repairs for Muslim trading fleets. Muslim traders would marry and settle with local women. Despite strict trade regulations, Burmese governors occasionally encouraged this intermarriage while barring Muslims from taking their local wives or children back when they left to boost population numbers. Muslim sailors built worship sites called Buddermokan which were mosques, but equally holy to four religions in Burmese trade ports They were shrines to the "God of the Flood" in memory of Badral-Din Awliya, who was worshipped as a nat by the Buddhists, a minor god by Hindus and Chinese and a saint by the Muslims. Buddermokans are found in Akyab, Sandoway and on a small island off Mergui.

In the 17th century, Muslims tried to control business and to become powerful. They were appointed, variously, governors of Mergui, viceroys of the provinces in Tenasserim and as port authorities. In 1617 AD, even after the English East India Company had established its factory at Masulipatnam, the Muslim merchants engaged themselves in trade between the Coromandel Coast and Pegu in Lower Burma. When the Burmese King Anaukpetlun reconquered Syriam in 1613 and Bago in 1617, the Muslim Moores in Masulipatan rejoiced greatly hoping to get the trade of Pegu into their hands again and prepared to send there two ships in the following September. Anaukpetlun also enslaved Indian mercenaries and battle ships from Syriam, resettling them in Shwebo., Successive kings, up to the reign of Thalun continued to resettle Muslim prisoners of war, particular in Myedu a village near Shwebo, as well as in Sagaing, Yamethin and Kyaukse.

==== Sanay Min ====
In 1707, the Taungoo king Sanay Min brought Muslim prisoners of war from Sandoway and settled them in Myedu. Three thousand Muslims from the weakening Kingdom of Mrauk U took refuge under his rule from 1698 to 1714. These refugees were divided and settled in Taungoo, Yamethin, Nyaung Yan, Yin Daw, Meiktila, Pin Dale, Tabet Swe', Bhodhii, Syi Tha, Siputtara, Myae du and Depayin. Another record from 1783 mentions these three thousand Muslims were relieved of military service in 1709 and settled instead.

Sanay Min also had two flotillas, named Elahee and Selamat, both Arabic Islamic names. These ships were recorded to have called at Forte St. George. The Elahee was used to send for missionaries exchanged between the Mughal Empire and the Burmese kingdom, being captained by an Arab. The diplomatic relations between the Court of Ava and Muslim Court of the Moghul began in 1706 AD, with an exchange of gifts recorded by the English factory in Madras.

=== Konbaung Dynasty ===
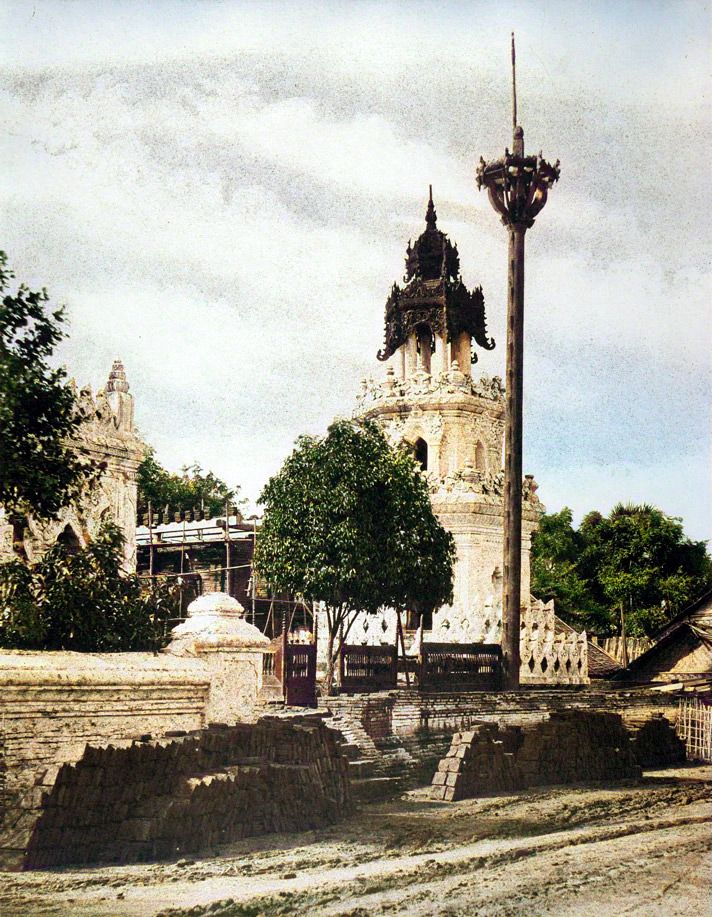
A Burmese-style mosque with an elaborately carved minaret in Amarapura during the Konbaung dynasty (coloured by AI)

During Alaungpaya's conquests to create the Konbaung Dynasty, Muslim soldiers fought against him in Pyay and Muslim rich men were recorded to have surrendered expensive presents and warships to him in Yangon. He captured many Muslim artillery men during his conquest of Syriam and later let them serve in his army. After his capture of Bago, a parade was held in which Pathi Muslim soldiers were allowed to march in their traditional uniforms. His campaign against Assam and Manipur of India brought more Muslims to settle in Burma. These Muslims were resettled from his conquests to Myedu and were called Myedu Kala or Kala Pyo.

==== Amarapura period ====
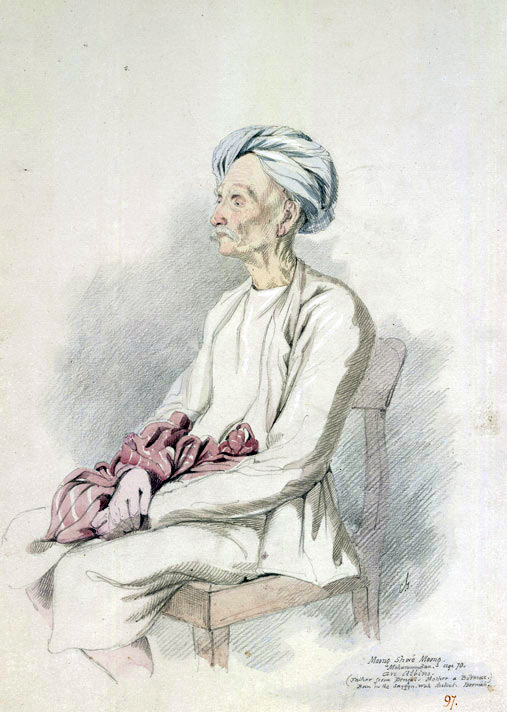
Depiction of a Burmese Muslim elder in 1855

When King Bodawpaya founded Amarapura as his new capital in 1783, he issued a royal decree officially recognising his Muslim subjects. He appointed special minister Abid Shah Hussaini to give judgement regarding conflicts amongst Muslim subjects.

During the rule of King Bagyidaw (1819–37), his general Maha Bandula conquered Assam and brought back 40,000 prisoners of war, half of whom were likely Muslims. During the First Anglo-Burmese War, Maha Bandula captured 200 mixed Sepoy Indians, among other spoils, at the battles near Ramu. Muslims amongst them were relocated to the south of Amarapura. Among Maha Bandula's forces was Captain Nay Myo Gone Narrat Khan Sab Bo who led the 70 Cavalry Regiment. Khan Sab Bo's name was Abdul Karim Khan and was the father of the Captain Wali Khan, who also led a famous cavalry regiment during the reigns of successive kings. Khan Sab Bo was sent as an ambassador to French Indochina by Bagyidaw.

he first mosque in Yangon was built in 1826 AD, at the end of first Anglo-Burmese Wars. It was destroyed by fighting in 1852 during the Second Anglo-Burmese War.

When King Tharrawaddy Min marched to Okkalapa, more than 100 Pathi Muslim Indian cannoneers took part.

Burmese kings of the Konbaung Dynasty employed a lot of Muslims in their inner circle: Royal bodyguards, eunuchs, couriers, interpreters and advisers. During the reign of Pagan Min, Muslims had significant roles in the administration. The governor of Amarapua was U Shwe Oh, a Burmese Muslim. A powerful clerk in Pagan Min's court, U Bein, was also responsible for the notable U Bein Bridge, a two-mile-long teakwood bridge. Sir Henry Yule saw many Muslims serving as eunuchs in the Burmese court while on a diplomatic mission there. He also noted that the previous governor of Bagan, who had been recently executed, had been a Muslim too. These Muslim eunuchs came from Arakan.

By 1855, Muslims in Amarapura numbered about 20,000 families, mostly Sunni Muslims. Abid Shah Hussaini burial place was well known as a shrine in Amarapura Lin Zin Gone Darga.

==== Mandalay period ====
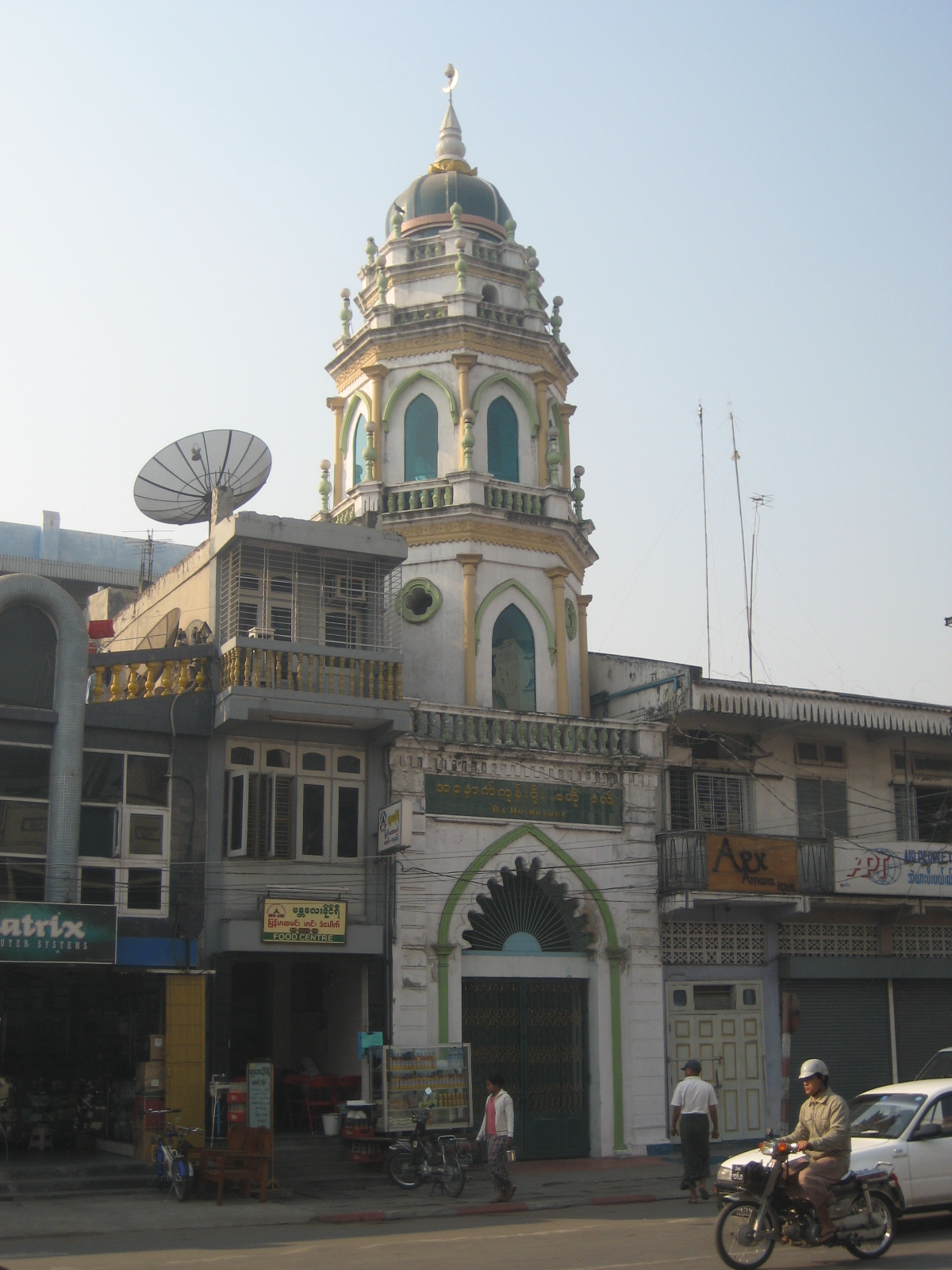
West Kone Yoe Central Mosque, built during the founding of Mandalay

Pagan Min was deposed by his brother Mindon Min following the Second Anglo-Burmese War. U Bo and U Yuet were two Kala Pyo Muslims who accompanied the princes when they fled to start the rebellion. Mindon showed favour to Muslims when he ascended the throne, giving several Muslims military and civil administrative ranks. In 1853, he ordered the preparation of halal food for his 700 Muslim horse cavalry soldiers during a donation ceremony. Upon the founding of Mandalay, several quarters with allocated spaces for mosques were granted to Muslims for settlement. U Bo later built and donated the June Mosque, which is still maintained in 27th street in modern Mandalay. U Yuet became the Chief Royal Chef. Mindon also donated teak pillars from the old palace to the construction of a mosque in the Oh Bo district of Mandalay.

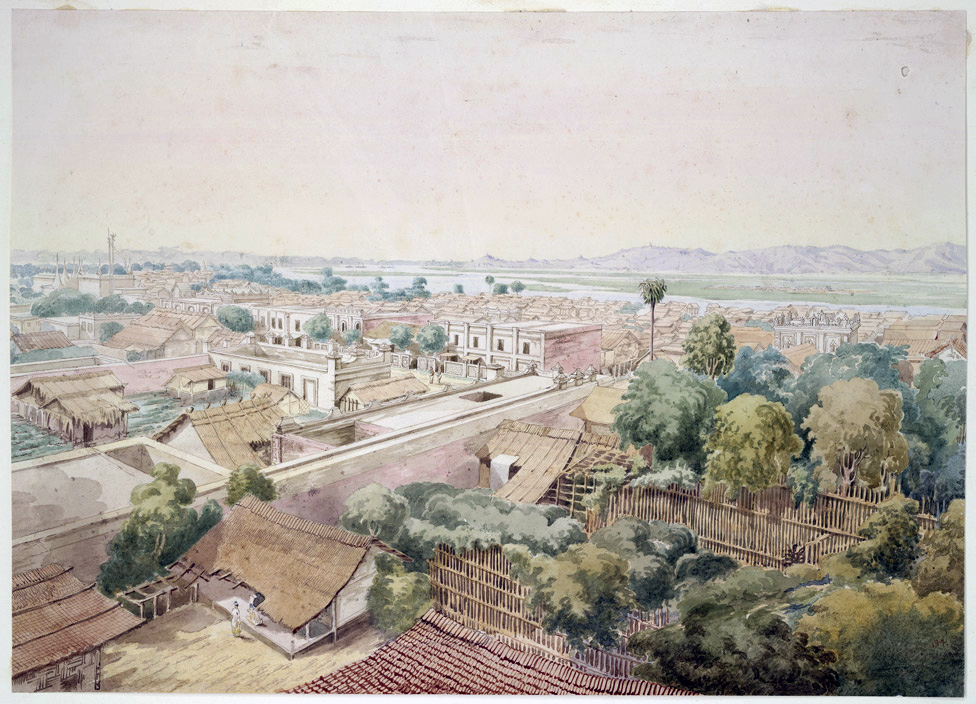
Panoramic view of Amarapura, with a Mosque on the right and Buddhist temples on the left

The Burmese Muslim quarters granted in Mandalay were:

- Sigaing dan
- Kone Yoe dan
- Taung Balu
- Oh Bo
- Setkyer Ngwezin
- June Amoke Tan
- Wali Khan Quarter
- Taik Tan Qr
- Koyandaw Qr (Royal Bodyguards' Qr)
- Ah Choke Tan
- Kala Pyo Qr
- Panthay dan for the Burmese Chinese Muslims.

Twenty mosques were allocated outside the Palace wall in those areas:

- Sigaing dan Mosque
- Kone Yoe Mosque
- Taung Balu Mosque
- June Mosque
- Koyandaw Mosque
- Wali Khan Mosque
- Kala Pyo Mosque
- Seven lots of lands for Setkyer Ngwezin
- Mandalay Panthay Mosque.

Inside the palace wall, Mindon Min constructed the Shwe Pannet mosque to accommodate his royal bodyguards. That mosque was demolished by in order to construct a polo playground.

Mindon Min additionally donated to building a rest house in Mecca for his Muslim subjects performing Hajj. Nay Myo Gonna Khalifa U Pho Mya and Haji U Swe Baw were ordered to supervise the building. The king completed the donations needed for the building, which had started with the donations from the Burmese Muslims. This was recorded in the Myedu Mosque imam U Shwe Taung's poems.

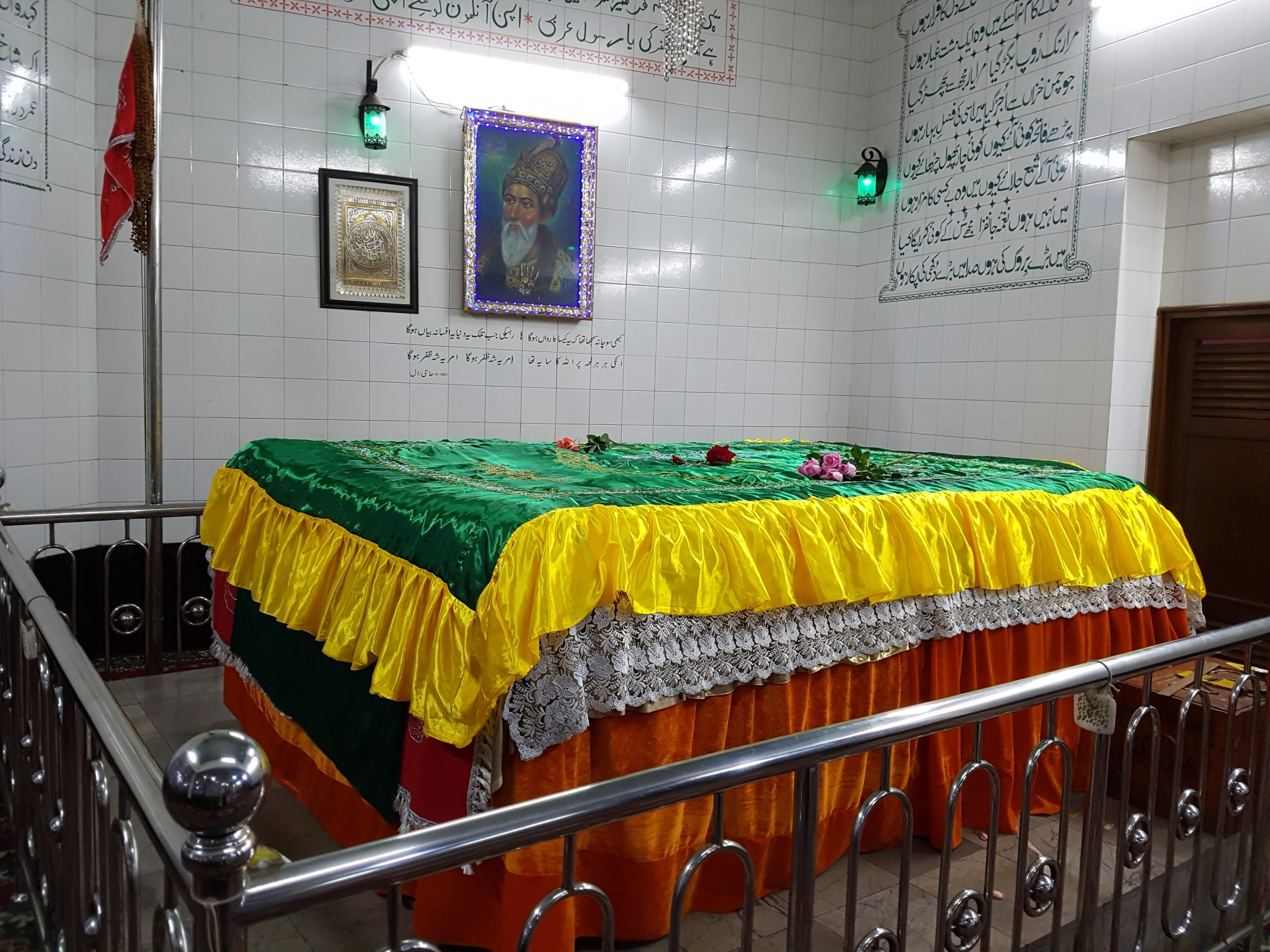
Mazar of Bahadur Shah II in Yangon

The last Mughal Emperor Bahadur Shah II and his family members and some followers were exiled to Yangon, Myanmar. He died during his imprisonment in Yangon and was buried on 7 November 1862. In the year 1991, Bahadur Shah II's grave was restored and was honoured by local Burmese Muslims as a Muslim saint.

During Thibaw Min's Third Anglo-Burmese War, one of the three army groups of the Burmese Army was led by the Akhbat Horse Cavalry Chief, Maha Min Htin Yar Zar. He was previously called U Chone and was the chief clerk of the Kala Pyo Army. He helped save the chief queen back to safety during the Myin Kun Myin Khone Taing revolt and was rewarded with the mayorship of the town of Pinle. Htin Yar Zar commanded 1,629 soldiers. Additionally, Captain Bo Min Htin Kyaw also commanded 350 Kindar Kala Pyo artillerymen, with four additional Muslim-led cannoneer regiments.

=== Muslim immigration to Colonial Burma ===
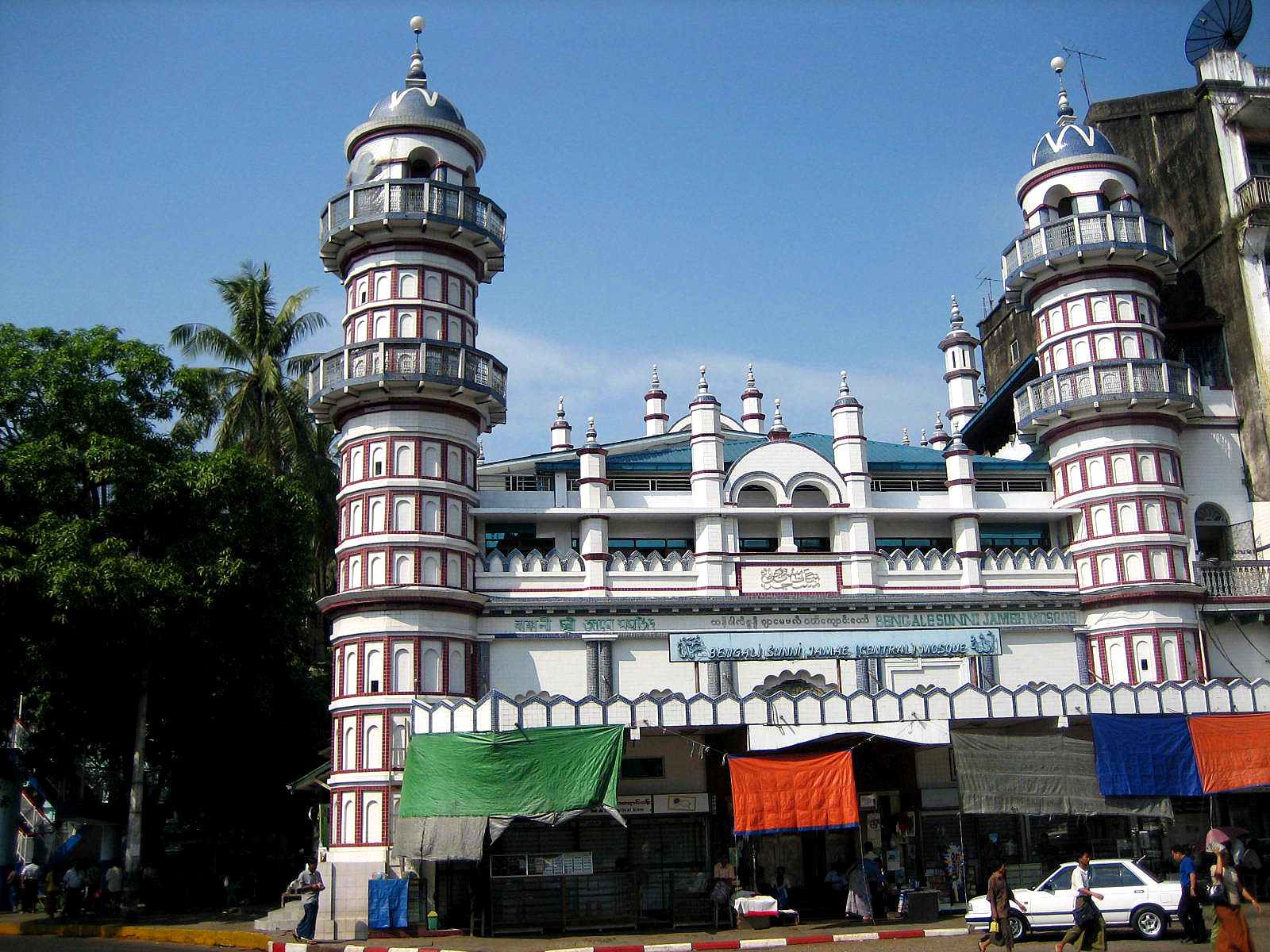
Sunni Jameh Mosque in downtown Yangon

Following the defeat of Thibaw Min by the British in 1885, Burmese Muslims formed many groups organisations for Burmese social welfare and religious affairs. On 28 November 1885, after the British took over, they included Kin Won Min Gyi, Tai Tar Min Gyi and Htin Yar Zar as representatives of the Parliament.

The population of the Muslims increased during the British rule in Burma because of new waves of Indian Muslim immigration. Under British rule, economic discrimination marginalised native Burmese workers, who were often replaced by Indian labourers. This fuelled resentment toward both colonial authorities and Indian immigrants. Anti-Indian sentiment peaked during the 1930 riots, intensifying racial tensions. Native Burmese sentiment turned against those whom they regarded as foreigners, including Muslims of all ethnic groups. Following this, the "Burma for Burmese" campaign inflamed xenophobic tensions and an altercation with British Indian police lead to significant anti-Muslim riots in 1938, where hundreds of mosques and Muslim-owned shops were damaged and Muslism were hurt and killed.

The population of Muslims in Myanmar would sharply decline in the years following 1941 as a result of the Indo-Burman Immigration agreement. The agreement itself was controversial in both India and Burma, but violent protests were cut short by the onset of the Second World War.

During the in Japanese invasion of Burma, the Chinese Muslim border town of Panglong, was entirely destroyed by the Japanese invaders.

=== Post-Independence Identity and Citizenship of Muslims ===
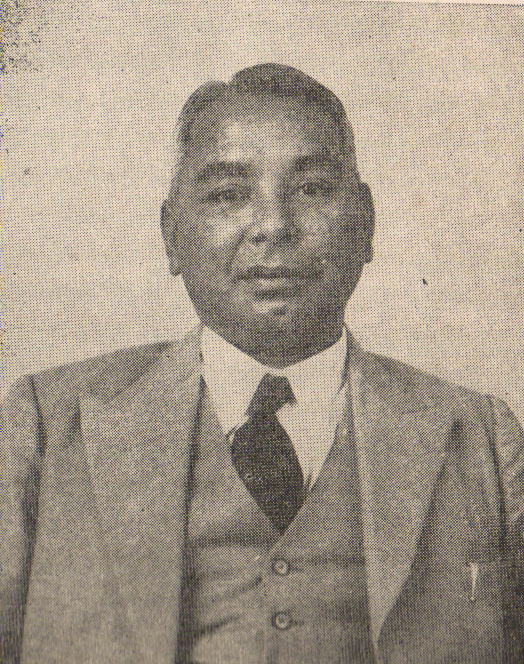
U Razak, a leader of the Burma Muslim Congress and one of eight Burmese martyrs

After Burma's independence from the British in 1948, Indian immigration to Burma all but stopped.

During the process of independence, various Burmese Muslim groups sought minority rights. Burmese Indians in particular faced strong opposition. These groups coalesced into the Burma Muslim Congress (BMC), which sought to establish themselves as a respectable community in Burma and opposed the Pakistan movement. The BMC joined the incoming governing party—the Anti-Fascist People's Freedom League (AFPFL)—in 1945 but were expelled in 1948 for being religious. They later rejoined after discontinuing their religious activity. The Muslim community became divided by this decision especially amongst those who disliked the idea of Burmese Muslims being treated as an ethnic minority. Ultimately, upon independence, Muslim minorities such as the Pathis, Kamein, Myedus and Arakanese Muslims were granted citizenship by the new constitution, but Indian Muslims were barred.

While many returned to India, most stayed, with many adopting Burmese names and customs to integrate in Burmese culture. Others emphasised pan-Islamic ties and Indian identity, creating tension with more assimilated Muslims. Indian Muslims remained dominant in Yangon while Burmanised Muslims concentrated in Upper Burma. Despite internal divisions, the Burmese Buddhist majority increasingly saw all Muslims as foreign Indians during this period and associated them with other minorities seeking separatism. They became targets in efforts to unite the nation by U Nu and to end the country's civil war in the early 1960s.

After the 1962 Burmese coup d'état, General Ne Win expelled Muslims from the army and were rapidly marginalised. The generic ethnic slur of "Kalar" came to refer negatively to Burmese Muslims during this time.

In 1982, Myanmar's nationality law was changed to deny citizenship to those who did not live in Burma prior to 1823, disenfranchising many Muslims in Myanmar, even though they had lived in Myanmar for several generations.

== Persecution ==
In the Taungoo period, Bayinnaung imposed restricts, such as banning Islamic ritual slaughter, including slaughter required for halal meat and the practice of Eid al-Adha. After Konbaung Empire was founded, King Alaungpaya continued the practice of banning Islamic ritual slaughter. Later, King Bodawpaya (1782–1819) arrested four famous Myanmar Muslims moulvis from Myedu and killed them in Ava, the capital, after they refused to eat pork.

During British rule in Burma, colonial economic stratification policies replaced native working classes with cheaper labourers from Bengal and elsewhere in India, fueling anti-Indian and more general anti-Muslim or xenophobic sentiment throughout the country. These events led to the creation of the "Burma for Burmese" Campaign, which staged a march to a Muslim Bazaar. Pictures of the British Indian police breaking up the demonstration, specifically images of them hurting Buddhist monks inflamed tensions causing anti-Muslim riots throughout the country, particularly near Mandalay, Sagaing and Shwebo. Hundreds of mosques, Muslim-owned houses and shops were looted, destroyed or set on fire. Following this, the British Governet set up the Inquiry Committee which determined the sociopolitical and economic conditions was the true cause of discontent and recommended rights to be guaranteed to all minorities and that Burmese Muslims be assigned special places in the Legislative Council. This report incited further hatred in Burmese newspapers, who were offended that the riots were not characterised as religious in nature.

=== Early post-independence persecution ===
The issue of Indian migration to Burma during British rule was a significant issue around the time of independence. Ultimately, Indian Muslims were denied citizenship, being seen as foreigners. Divisions grew internally as many Indian Muslims, especially in Upper Burma, attempted to assimilate into Burmese culture wanting to be "Burmese in public and Muslims in their homes". Despite these divisions and the prominence of unrelated Muslim minorities, the Burmese Buddhist majority increasing saw all Muslims as foreigners who needed to be dealt with to end the country's civil war in the 1960s. This came despite a 1959 ruling from the Supreme Court of Myanmar that people who are "totally unlike the Burmese in appearance ... are nevertheless statutory citizens under the Union" regardless of race on a case regarding a Rohingya person.

After the coup d'état of General Ne Win in 1962, Muslims were expelled from the army and were rapidly marginalised. The generic ethnic slur of "Kalar" used against perceived "dark-skinned foreigners" gained especially negative connotations when referring to Burmese Muslims during this time. Accusations of "terrorism" were made against Muslim organisations such as the All Burma Muslim Union, causing Muslims to join armed resistance groups to fight for greater freedoms. Ne Win targeted Burmese Indian and nationalised their businesses, causing mass emigration.

General Ne Win immediately reduced the Haj quota for Muslims to 102 persons only in the whole country. From next year, since 1963, he totally prohibited Muslims from performing Haj. After 17 years of total denial of Haj pilgrimage, only in 1980, open back that blockage and allowed 150 Muslims to perform Haj. Only in 1990 his successor military coup junta, SPDC or The State Peace and Development Council increase the quota to 200 persons, but with private Hajj travel companies, not limited for Hajj because all Hajj travelers were taking Hajj visa from Thailand. In 2005 after opening embassy of Saudi Arabia to Yangon, allowed 3000 persons for Hajj for the whole country; via private or government. In 2012, during the Thein Sein Gov, 5000 persons are allowed to perform Haj with the help of 50 Haj travel agents.

=== Riots in Mandalay (1997) ===
On 16 March 1997 beginning at about 3:30 p.m., following reports of an attempted rape by Muslim men and an incident with the Mahamuni Buddha Temple, a mob Buddhist monks and others gathered in Mandalay, targeting mosques and Muslim-owned shops, houses and vehicles. Looting, destruction of property, assault, sectarian violence and religious desecration spread throughout the country. At least three people were killed and around 100 monks arrested.

=== Riots in Sittwe and Taungoo (2001) ===
In February 2001, deeply rooted tensions between Buddhists and Muslims in Sittwe escalated into violence after a dispute at a food stall. Riots broke out with Buddhist mobs setting fire to Muslim homes and properties. Police and soldiers reportedly stood by.

In 2001, anti-Muslim sentiment in Myanmar intensified with the distribution of inflammatory pamphlets by monks and State Peace and Development Council junta's Union Solidarity and Development Association. Tensions escalated following the destruction of the Buddhas of Bamiyan in Afghanistan, with monks in Taungoo demanding mosque demolitions in retaliation. On 15 May, riots led by monks and mobs resulted in around 200 Muslim deaths, destruction of mosques, and the burning of hundreds of homes. Pro-junta forces were reported to have beaten worshippers inside mosques. The military intervened after two days, imposing curfews and communication blackouts. The riots were contained, but the violence further increased religious tension.

=== Riots in Rakhine (2012) ===
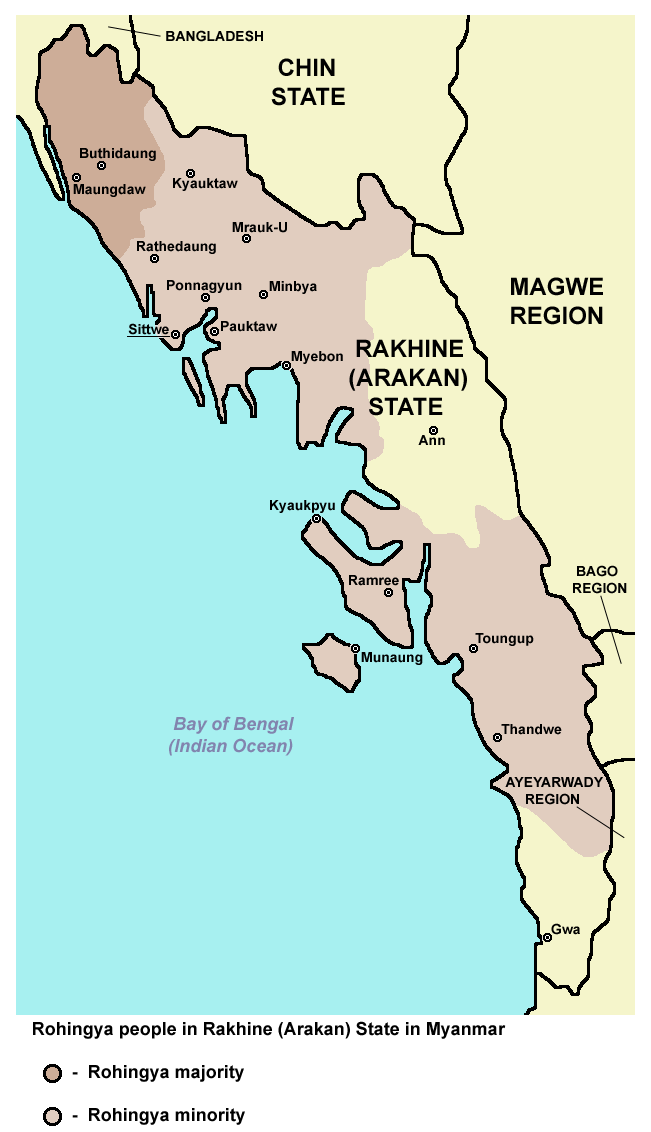
Rohingya people in Rakhine State

In June 2012, violence erupted in western Myanmar's Rakhine State between ethnic Arakanese and Rohingya following reports of a rape circulated by an incendiary pamphlet. Thousands of Rohingya, led by religious leaders, rioted in Maungdaw, destroying property and killing Arakanese residents. Sectarian violence then quickly swept through the Arakan State capital, Sittwe, and surrounding areas The riots destroyed thousand of houses and caused 77 deaths amongst other damage including an internal refugee crisis.

In November, the International Network of Engaged Buddhists released a statement calling for the conflict to be resolved and stating that more than 75,000 people had been displaced and impoverished.

The junta's military intelligence service is suspected to have placed agents provocateur within the monkhood to incite or lead riots based on provoking monks' government connections and their use of mobile phones- a luxury at the time.

=== 2013 and 2014 riots ===
Tensions between Muslim and Buddhist communities flared up to several violent riots across the country in 2013. This violence coincided with the rise of the Buddhist nationalist 969 Movement and its leader Wirathu.

Buddhists and Muslims also clashed for three days in Mandalay in July 2014 following tensions from an alleged rape incident. Vengeful mobs attacked Muslim shops, vehicles and residential areas with two dying in the riots.

=== Rohingya genocide ===
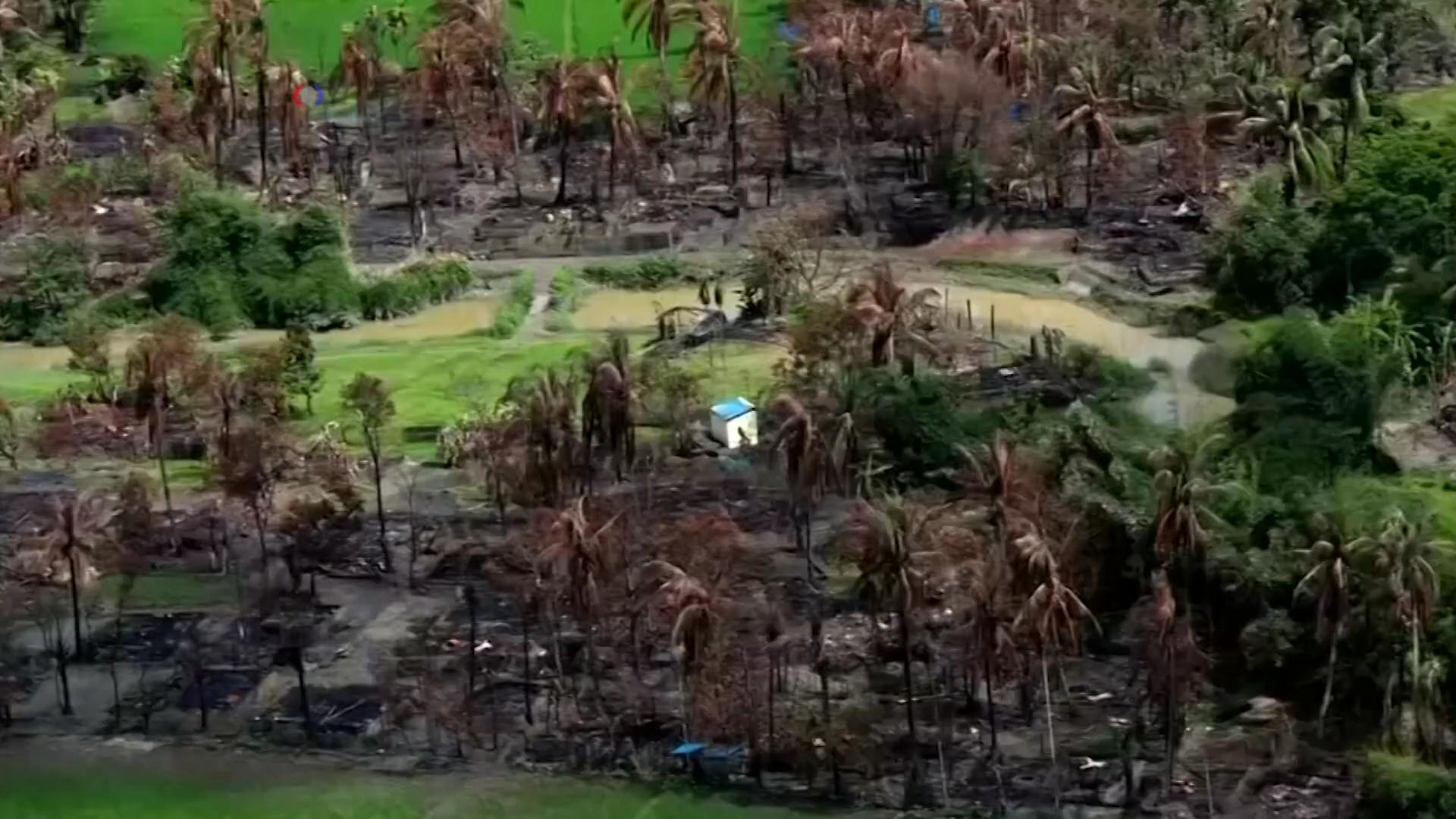
Destroyed village in Rakhine State, September 2017

In late 2016, the Myanmar military forces and extremist Buddhists started a major crackdown on the Rohingya Muslims in northern Rakhine State, in response to attacks on border police camps by unidentified insurgents. The crackdown resulted in wide-scale human rights violations at the hands of security forces, including extrajudicial killings, gang rapes, arsons, and other brutalities. The crackdown was widely criticised. The newly democratic government's de facto leader Aung San Suu Kyi has particularly been criticized for her inaction and silence over the issue.

In August 2017, the second phase of the Rohingya genocide was carried out with the United Nations concluding that ethnic cleansing had occurred. At least 6,700 Rohingya were killed in the first month of attacks, between 25 August and 24 September 2017. The Burmese government dismissed these findings by stating they are "exaggerations". A study conducted in January 2018 estimated that the military and the local Rakhine population killed at least 25,000 Rohingya people and perpetrated gang rapes and other forms of sexual violence against 18,000 Rohingya women and girls. They estimated that 116,000 Rohingya were beaten, and 36,000 were thrown into fires. The military operations displaced a large number of people, with the largest wave of Rohingya refugees fleeing Myanmar in 2017.

== See also ==
- 2012 Ramu violence
- 969 Movement
- Burmese Chinese
- Burmese Indians
- Burmese Malays
- List of Burmese Muslims
- List of Masjids in Mandalay
- Pakistanis in Burma
- Panthays (Burmese Chinese Muslims)
- Rohingya people
- Religion in Myanmar
- Rohingya insurgency in Western Myanmar
- 2016–17 Northern Rakhine State clashes
