= Myoza (royal title) =

Burmese peerage title

Myoza or Myosa (Burmese: မြို့စား) is a high-ranking royal title and position for Burmese royalty and nobility. Various types of myoza existed depending on the dynastic period. Some myozas possessed broad administrative powers, while others only wore a titular title and possessed the right to taxes in their territory, without political authority.

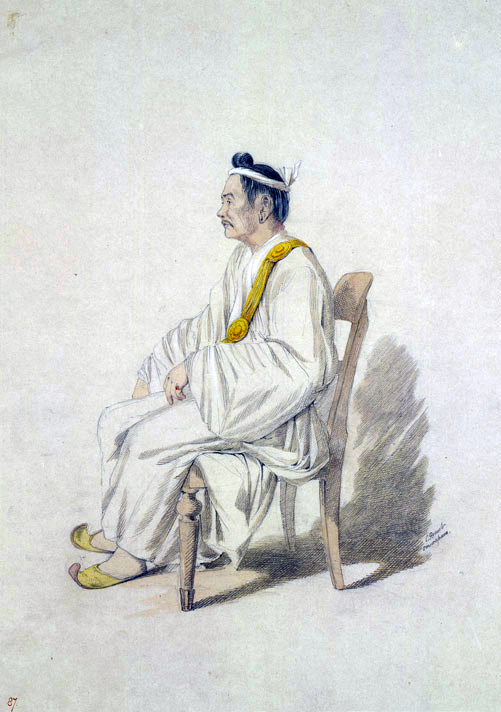
British illustration of a typical royal Myoza

== History ==
The monarch held the absolute power to control everything in his kingdom. Below the monarch's rank, queens, princes, princesses, relatives of the royal family, nobles, ministers, and court officials possessed the towns representing specific regions, thereby receiving the revenues from those towns or villages.

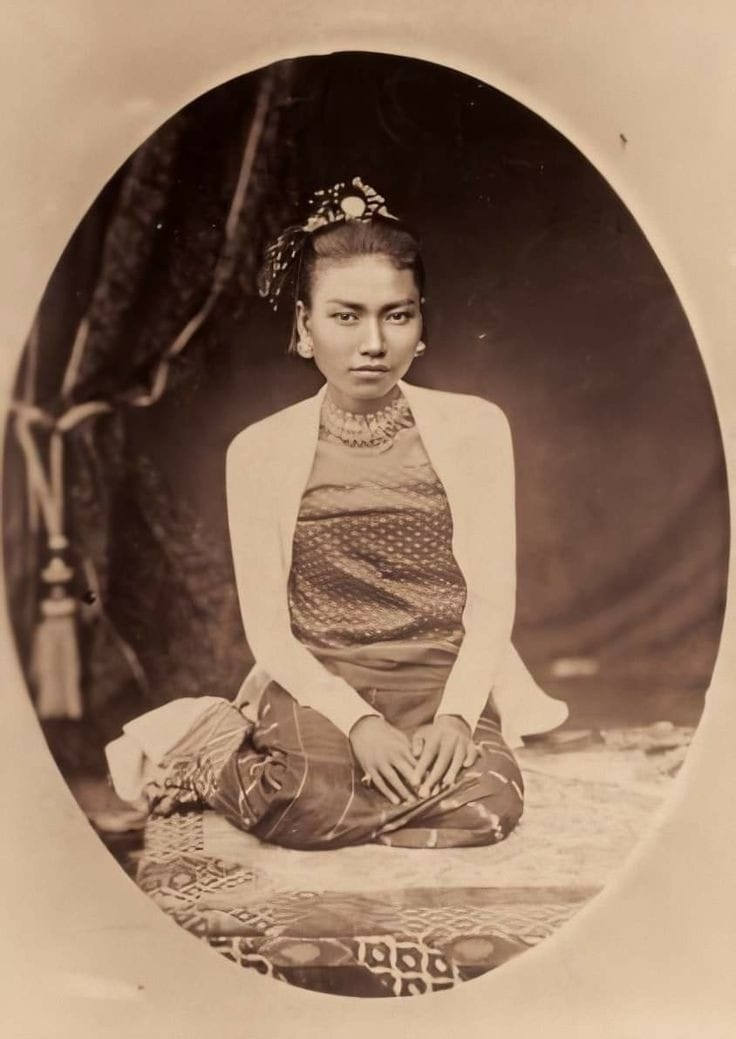
Queen Supayalat was myoza of Myadaung in her youth.

Since the Pagan period, every member of the royal family had received the title of myoza, literally translated as "town-eaters" or "ruler of town/territory", which may be an equivalent of the title of Duke. Each royal was honored with the possession of at least one territory by the King, and they were predominantly recognized by their respective possessions. For instance, Burma's last king, King Thibaw was so known by his princely fief of Thibaw (Hsipaw in Shan State).

During the Konbaung period, Royal Queens of the fourth rank were referred to as Myosa Mibaya ("town-lord queen", မြို့စားမိဖုရား) or Ywaza Mibaya ("village-lord queen", ရွာစားမိဖုရား). They held ownership of a specific town or village and were identified by the name of their possession. For example, the queen who possessed Tharazein was known as Tharazein Mibaya.

Depending on their rank, royals and nobles were required to own towns. The younger children of a monarch, as well as junior officials and obscure nobles, owned land at the village level. The title of myoza was not exclusive to royal and court officials; it could also be held by favored court entertainers or servants, such as ladies-in-waiting. For example, Queen Supayalat's lady-in-waiting, Khin Sein, was granted the appanage of Dawagone village. Similarly, the court dancer Yindaw Ma Lay was granted the appanage of Yindaw as her fiefdom.

== Administration of kingdom ==
The kingdom was divided into provinces called myo (town, မြို့). These provinces were administered by myoza, who were members of the royal family or the highest-ranking officials of the Hluttaw. They collected revenue for the royal government, payable to the Shwedaik (Royal Treasury) in fixed instalments, and retained whatever was left over. Each myo was subdivided into districts called taik (တိုက်), administered by Taikza ('governor of district', တိုက်စား), which contained collections of villages called ywa (ရွာ), administered by Ywaza ('governor of village', ရွာစား).

The kingdom's peripheral coastal provinces (Pegu, Tenasserim, Martaban and Arakan) were administered by a Viceroy called a Myowun, who was appointed by the king and possessed civil, judicial, fiscal, and military powers. Provincial councils (myoyon) consisted of myo saye (town scribes), nakhandaw (receivers of royal orders), sitke (chiefs of war), htaunghmu (jailer), ayatgaung (head of the quarter), and dagahmu (warden of the gates). Each province was divided into districts called myo, each led by a myo ok (if appointed), or by a myo thugyi (if the office was hereditary). The Viceroy of Pegu was assisted by several additional officials, including an akhunwun (revenue officer), akaukwun (customs collector), and a yewun (conservator of port).

The myoza title was not formally used in the Shan states, which were tributary states of the Burmese monarch. Instead, three recognized ranks of Shan chiefs were acknowledged by both the King of Burma and later by the British administration:

- Saopha (Shan for king or chieftain)
- Myoza
- Ngwegunhmu (silver revenue chief)

== Power of myoza and myowun ==
The king gave modest territories to lowland rulers called myoza. They had to pay tribute, send troops and show loyalty to the king in exchange for the right to collect taxes. Myowun (governors) were also empowered by the king, but they had less independence than myoza. The king could appoint and dismiss them at any time to enforce his rule. Myowun had to regulate trade, tax the people and keep their myo (districts) safe and orderly. Myothugyi, local hereditary leaders of villages and hamlets, worked with the myowun to serve the government's interest. They had to send the revenue to the nearest treasury and resolve civil disputes. The Burmese people in the lowlands were assigned to different groups or regiments, each with a captain. They had to follow and pay their captains, even if they lived far away, and consult them for any civil issues.

After the appointment of the myoza, the myoza had to send a myothein lulin (မြို့သိမ်းလုလင်, town capture man) to capture the town on behalf of the myoza. The myothein lulin brought tea leaves and presented them to the myowun on behalf of the myoza. Subsequently, the myowun distributed the tea leaves equally among the households in the town. Following this, the town's residents paid two and a half kyats to their lord, the myoza, who presented the tea leaves. They offered a half kyat to the myothein lulin responsible for bringing the tea leaves, and one kyat to the myowun who distributed the tea leaves. In total, each household gave four kyats of silver.

In the event of a legal case in that town, the myowun or myothugyi of the town is obligated to assume responsibility and resolve it on behalf of the myoza. If both the plaintiffs and defendants are dissatisfied with the myowun's decision, they have the option to appeal to the myoza in the royal capital for a final decision on the case. Thus, the myoza holds judicial authority within their domain.

The myoza-princes (king's sons) and blue-blooded myoza (relatives of the king) have the right to attend the Hluttaw (the royal parliament) behind the position of the crown prince. Behind the myoza-princes, court officials and ministers are placed.

== Apaing-za ==
In the era of the Burmese monarchy, the term apaing-za (အပိုင်စား) was utilized, indicating the king's act of granting possession of specific entities like mountains, rivers, lakes, and territories. Typically, the king would bestow apaing-za upon nats (spirits) or deities through a royal order, designating them as titular spiritual possessors.

For instance, Mingyi and Minlay faced punishment from King Anawrahta for neglecting their duties and subsequently met their demise at the hands of the executor. In a plea, the spirit brothers manifested themselves in front of King Anawrahta and requested apaing-za (possession) of territory. Responding to their plea, King Anawrahta granted them possession of Taungbyon.

In 123, when King Duttabaung visited a pagoda in Minbu, the dragon siblings, who had become spirits after being killed by a giant eagle, manifested themselves in front of the king and requested possession of territory. King Duttabaung granted them control over a mountain near Minbu, now known as Dragon's Bubbles Mountain. Since that time, the dragon siblings have been worshipped as the guardians of Dragon's Bubbles Mountain.

King Tharrawaddy declared a royal order appointing Ma Phae Wah as the possessor of all cemeteries in the Kingdom of Burma and designated her as the guardian of the cemeteries during his reign.

== Sources ==
- Bird, George W. (1897). Wanderings in Burma. F.J. Bright & Sons.
- Nisbet, John (1901). Burma Under British Rule—and Before. Vol. 1. Archbald Constable & Company.
- Seekins, Donald M. (2006). Historical Dictionary of Burma (Myanmar). Scarecrow Press. ISBN 9780810864863.
