= Taungdaw Thakhinma =

Burmese deity

Taungdaw Thakhinma (Burmese: တောင်တော်သခင်မ; lit. 'mistress of the great mountain') is a Burmese nat (deity) and guardian spirit of Mount Thakhinma. Nowadays, she stands as a symbol of unwavering love, maintaining her loyalty to her husband by giving her life. Her worshippers believe that prayers at her shrine can grant wishes and fortify their own love relationships.

== Legend ==
Legend tells of Taungdaw Thakhinma, once a girl named Ma Shwe U, the daughter of U Shwe Thee, and his wife Daw O Zar. U Shwe Thee was a royal servant during the reign of King Anawrahta, and he cleared the forest at the foot of Mount Mya Thein Tan to establish In Kyal village. Ma Shwe U, skilled at weaving and exceptionally pretty, drew frequent visits from the Shwe Hpyin brothers due to her beauty. Shwe Hpyin Nyidaw developed a crush on her and proposed, but she refused, leading to Shwe Hpyin Nyidaw harboring resentment.

Following this, Ma Shwe U's parents arranged her marriage to Ko Yin Maung, a timber merchant from Taungbyone, and she moved to live with him in Taungbyone village. The Shwe Hpyin brothers faced punishment from King Anawrahta for neglecting their duties, meeting their demise at the hands of the executor and becoming nats (spirits). Shwe Hpyin Nyidaw's desire for Ma Shwe U persisted even in the spirit life. Later, as Ko Yin Maung journeyed down a wooden raft to the upper Meza area, Shwe Hpyin Nyidaw confessed his love to Ma Shwe U. However, when she didn't reciprocate, he ordered his mount tiger to kill her. For her courage, she became a martyr to the local populace and later entered the pantheon of Burmese nats as the guardian of Mount Yinkhet, also known as Mount Thakhinma or Mount Ma Ma U, where she died. Upon learning of Ma Shwe U's death, Ko Yin Maung died of heartbreak, and he too became a nat. Before her death, Ma Shwe U vowed, "I only loved my husband Ko Yin Maung in my lifetime, and if this vow is true, let the punnaga trees grow on this mountain from the punnaga flower wreath I have placed at my head". Because of her truthful vow, the punnaga trees grew in that place, which can still be seen nowadays.

That's why every year, from the 4th to the 8th day of the tagu month, a flower-picking festival is held at Mount Thakhinma. It is a tradition that no one has the right to wear flowers without offering to the goddess first.

The enmity persisted until she transformed into a spirit because she was killed by Shwe Hpyin Nyidaw in her human life. During the Taungbyone Festival, when the statues of the Shwe Hpyin brothers are taken to the river for the royal bathing ceremony, they pass by the road next to the shrine of Ma Shwe U. Consequently, the shrine's attendants must cover it. It is believed that if the shrine of Ma Shwe U is not securely veiled with a long shawl, the statue of Ma Shwe U will automatically turn to the other side.

== Shrines ==
Her main shrines can be found at Mount Thakhinma and Taungbyone village. The shrine of Taungdaw Thakhinma is also located on the northern stairway of Mandalay Hill. According to local legend, one day, a beautiful woman approached U Khandi, a highly venerated hermit, and donated numerous gold and silver coins. When U Khandi inquired about her address, she simply replied, "I'm Ma U", and descended the north stairs. Due to her significant donation, the shrine of Ma Shwe U was established at this location.

The location of her house in In Kyal village is unknown, and many historians are attempting to unveil it. Bodaw Ko Ko Gyi, a mystic believed to be a weizza, reportedly discovered her house and documented it in his book. When his cousin Daw Thi (the owner of Daw Thi thanakha business) and her husband U Shwe found and read Bodaw Ko Ko Gyi's book, they accurately located Ma Shwe U's house based on his record. Since 1982, the area has been purchased, and a new shrine for Ma Shwe U has been established.
