= Taungbyone Festival =

Religious festival in Myanmar

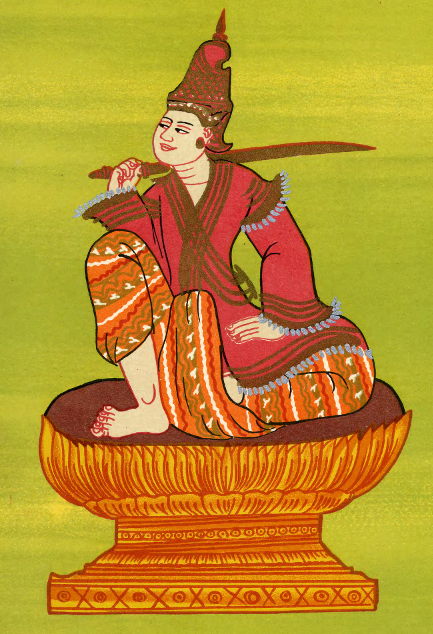
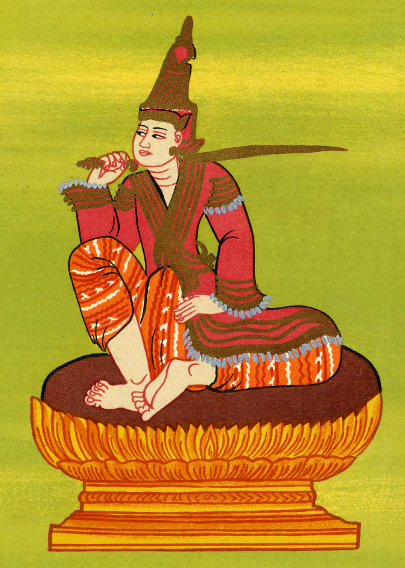
The two brothers of Taungbyone: Shwe Hpyin Naungdaw (left) and Shwe Hpyin Nyidaw (right)

The Taungbyone Festival (Burmese: တောင်ပြုန်းပွဲတော်; also spelt Taungbyon) is one of the most well-known festivals among the people of Myanmar, held annually in honour of the Taungbyon nat brothers or the two brothers of Taungbyone village. Actually it is the festival of the two pagodas, by the name of Sutaungpyae built by King Anawrahta and the later-built Sutaungya. The pagodas' festival is designated to be celebrated for two days, from the eighth waxing day to the tenth of the Burmese month of Wagaung. At the same time, the nat festival is held alongside that of the pagodas.

Taungbyone festival is very crowded with people coming from various parts of the country during the festival days in August. A special ritual program is carried out each day. More popularly, the spirit-mediums' dance is a major aspect of the festival and occurs throughout the days.

The festival is not only a place for those who take the cult of nat within the sphere of Burmese Theravada Buddhism but a place for those who seek fun. One can watch folk dramas, ceremonial dance and find opportunities to gamble, socialize and drink.

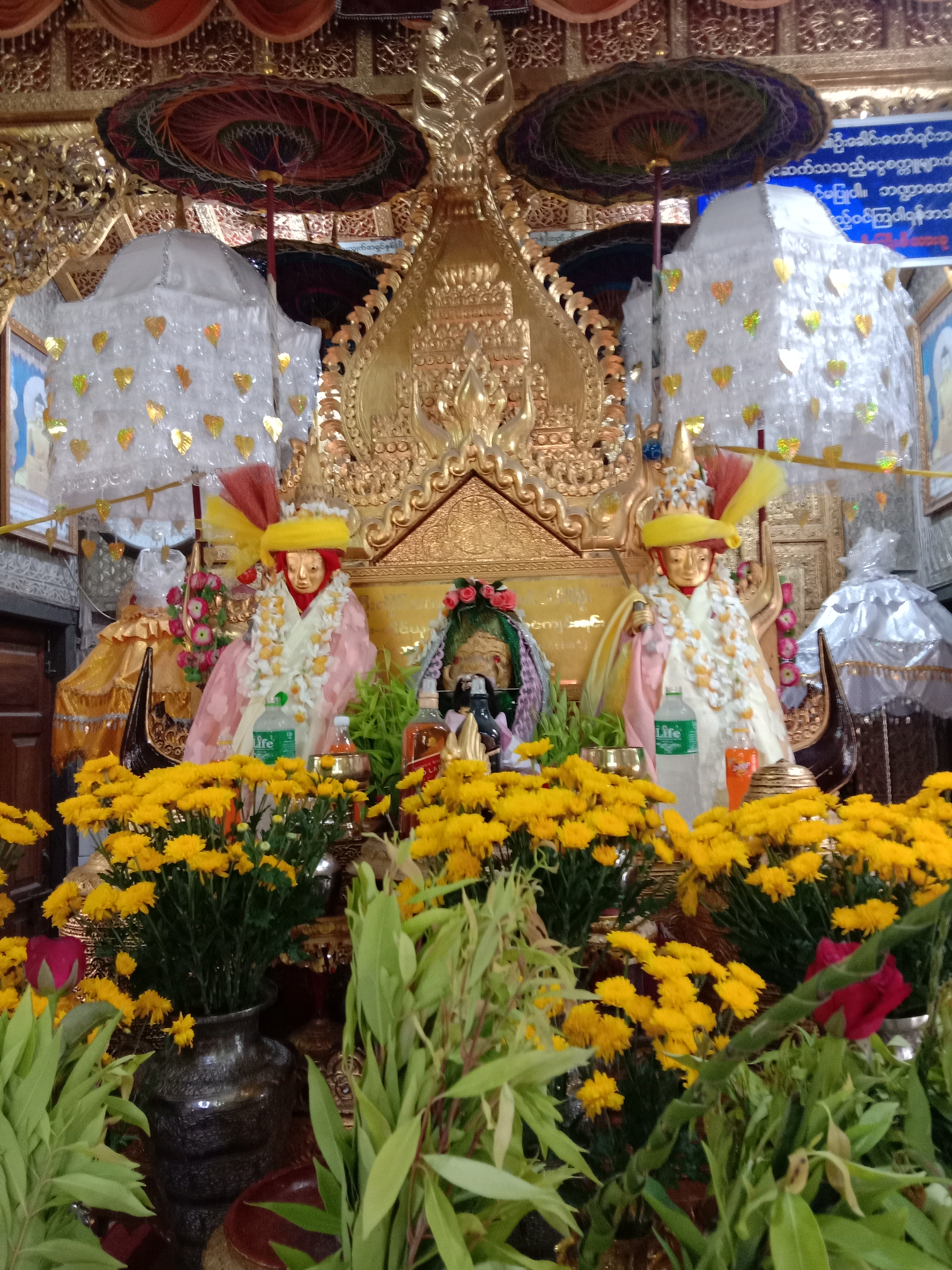
Nat statues in the main shrine in Taungbyone

== Location and site ==
The festival takes place every year honouring the spirits of two brothers of Taungbyone belonging to the Burmese pantheon of '37' nats. Taungbyone village is located about 15 kilometres (9.3 mi) north of Mandalay, the last royal capital of the Burmese monarchy. As the village is situated in central Myanmar, it is usually hot, dry and dusty, with a population of over three thousand according to the 2019 governmental report.

=== Festival grounds ===
During the festival, all free space of the village are occupied with the temporary infrastructure, or massive temporary bazaar comprising stalls of every kind that sell food, fruit, flowers, toys, clothing, tools, craft, trinkets as well as restaurants, sideshow, theatres for Burmese traditional drama and/or anyeint. There are a large crowd of people shopping, eating, dancing, carousing and gambling on the grounds. As it draws many thousands, security and emergency services like the police, the Red Cross, and the firefighters are put on standby because fights occasionally occur.

=== Overview of the site ===
The two pagodas, Sutaungpyae and Sutaungya, are situated north of the main nat shrine or the nat palace of the brothers, which is composed of two pavilions. In the first pavilion lie several statues of the nats, such as the two brothers (Shwe Hpyin Nyidaw and Shwe Hpyin Naungdaw), Ma Hne Lay and Mandalay Bodaw. Nowadays the second pavilion is for holding the ritual shower. These nat palaces and domains are owned by a family whose members are 'palace guardians'.

There are also many secondary nat palaces, which started to be built in the mid-1980s to house some spirit-mediums having no traditional place. (Note: Some mediums have no rights to perform in the main palace.)

== Legend ==
A brief account of the two Taungbyone brothers, who served in the army of King Anawrahta and their death, is given in Glass Palace Chronicle, which is the translated work covering only several portions of Hmannan Yazawin. Their compelling story is, with mythological motifs, dramatized and expressed in folklore, nat thamaing (legendary biographies of the nat) in particular. Consequently, it could animate and give life to a myth so that it can draw people's attention to the scenes in their myth and reenact their dramas in the ritual being performed.

=== Their origin ===
The Muslim traders were shipwrecked off Thaton and two brothers among them reached the city riding a plank, which drifted ashore near Thaton. They were known as Byatwi and Byatta. (Note: Melford Spiro described their names, Byatwi and Byatta as Abraham and Ibrahim in his book.) Upon reaching the shore, they took refuge in the monastery, in which an abbot resided, venerated by King Manuha of Thaton Kingdom. The monk took care of and kept them near him.

One day, in the absence of the monk, the two brothers cooked and ate the body of the dead Zawgyi, a hermit-like being with supernatural power and alchemist that had been found by chance in the forest, preserved by the monk for medicine, which could serve both the elixir of life and magical power. They gained extraordinary powers. Such news spread out across the kingdom and finally reached into the ear of the king, who got worried sick. He thus ordered his men to capture them. The king's men seized and killed the elder brother, then dismembered his body and buried those parts around the city wall as a protective charm against the enemies who might attack and seize the city.

The younger brother, nevertheless, escaped and could flee to Bagan, where he served King Anawrahta, who later appointed him as his 'flower officer' for his superhuman strength. He rode his steed daily to get to Mount Popa over 30 miles south of Bagan, gather and offer flowers to the king when returned.

=== The Taungbyone brothers ===
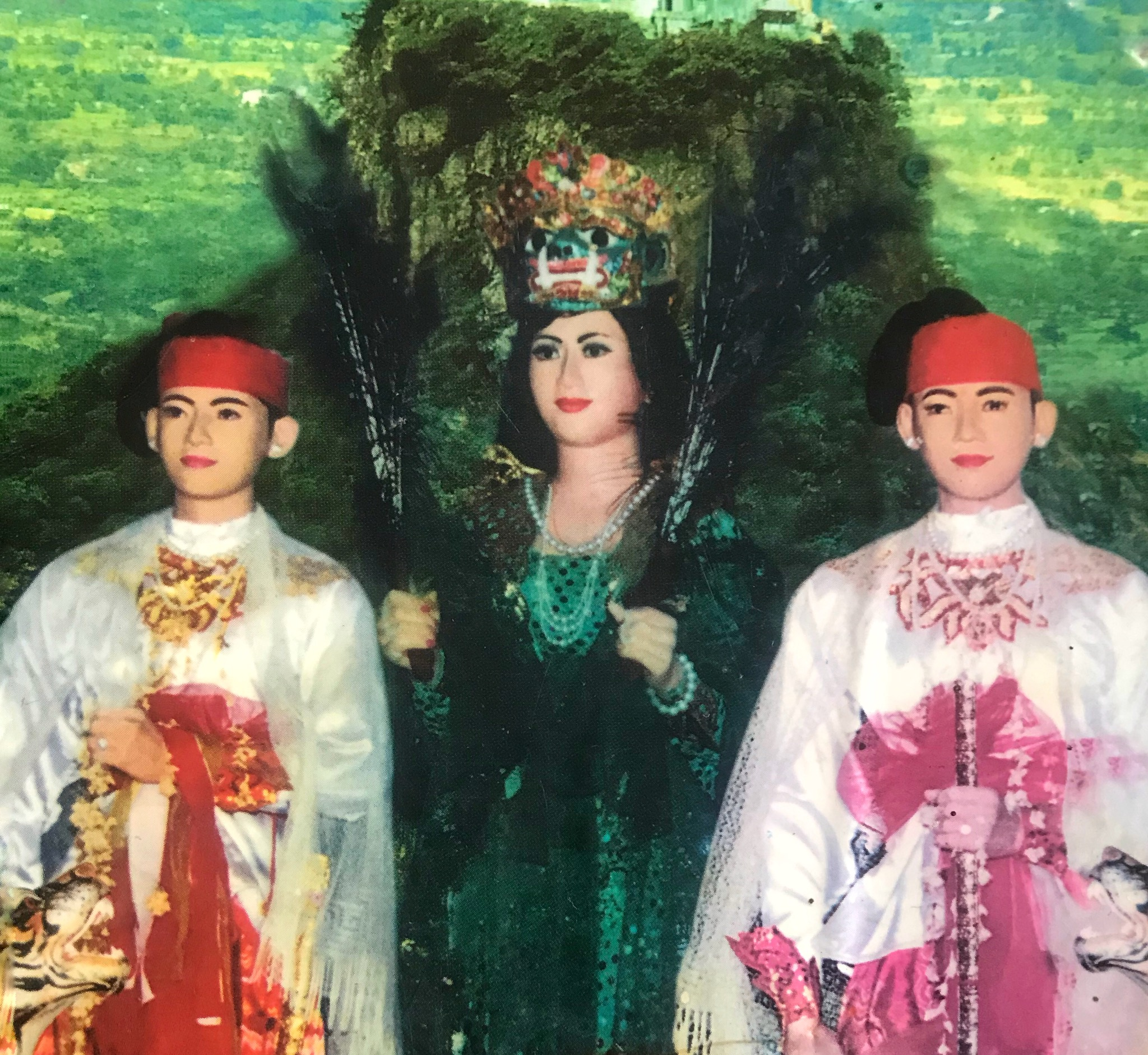
Statue of Popa Medaw with her two sons, Shwe Hpyin Naungdaw and Shwe Hpyin Nyidaw.

He and a girl named 'Me Wunna' on the mountain (legend says she is a floral ogress living on the mountain) fell in love with each other and begot two sons, known as the Shwepyin brothers. When they grew up, they served the king in his mission to make an effort to bring the eyetooth of the Buddha, residing in Gandhala (Gandhalarit), China. On the return journey of the king and his army, the king's elephant stopped and knelt down at a certain place in Taungbyon village, where the king had a pagoda built and named it 'Sutaungpyae'. The king ordered all his men to contribute their personal service towards the construction, at the very least, each for a work of bringing and laying a brick in the pagoda.

The Pagoda was completed and the king came to conduct a visual check but found out a small empty space of two-brick size in the pagoda. When asked, the king's men told him that the Shwepyin brothers did not do anything to help build the pagoda and played a game of marbles instead. As a punishment, Anawrahta ordered that the two brothers be beaten with a small cane, but actually beaten to death with a large and thick bamboo pole (Wayindote - ဝါးရင်းတုတ်). As they inherited extraordinary power from their father, the beats did come to no harm to them. At last, they had to die of being had their testicles crushed. (Note: They are traditionally believed to have been killed in the beats of the big bamboo pole.)

However the Glass Palace Chronicle told simply of their death as "he put to death at Wayindot (Note: Wayindot (or) Wayindote is a village near the village of Taungbyon where the two brothers are believed to die and the word means a large and thick bamboo pole) the Shwehpyin brothers, for he trusted them not." All of a sudden after their doomed-to-death, they became evil spirits, stopped the royal raft of the king on his return journey to Pagan and put in an appearance before the king, whom they requested to give them a site to live as fief. Then the king had a spirit-palace or nat-shrine built near the pagoda in the village of Taungbyon and enfeoffed them fields around the site. An annual festival has since been held to celebrate them.

== Festival programs or ritual setting ==
Three commemorative events are held in honour of the spirits of the Taungbyon brothers annually : their departure for the war in December, their return in March and their disappearance in August, of which the last is of importance and draws tens of thousands of people, including a number of spirit mediums or natkadaws (နတ်ကတော်), to participate in it as hereditary obligations or propitiation or for jolly sake. The festival starts from the eight waxing day to the full moon of Wagaung, roughly equivalent to August, lasting eight or nine days altogether, each of which has its own commemorative event :

- 1st and 2nd days - Homage to the nats (ကန်တော့ခံ)
- 3rd day - Night meeting of the royal council (ညညီလာခံ)
- 4th day - The ritual shower (ချိုးရေတော်သုံး)
- 5th day - Enthronement (နန်းတက်)
- 6th day - Hare hunting (ယုန်ထိုး)
- 7th day - Felling trees (ထိမ်ခုတ်)
- 8th day - The good send-off for Pakhan nat (ပုခန်းမင်းပို့) (Note: some sources do not include this ritual event as a separate day of the festival)
- 9th day - The gilding of the statues (ရွှေဘုံဆင်း) (Note: This event is not usually considered to be part of the festival but it is still part of the ritual stages. If this event day is added to the festival, it will be that of 9 days' duration.)

=== The opening ritual ===
The nat festival starts with paying respect to and the invocation to the nat on the first and second days, in which a spirit medium taking the role of an announcer sings a specially designated song (နတ်သံ) for the nat, similar to ode, which retells the life of the nat. The Burmese traditional orchestra called Hsaing waing plays the nat music and the seemingly possessed medium dances to the music. The mediums' dance is the major element of the festival and occurs throughout the days of the festival. It is said that the third day is the official opening of the festival, on which day 'Night meeting of the royal council' is held by displaying several ritual activities and mediums' dance.

=== The ritual shower ===
Then came the fourth day of the festival to celebrate 'the ritual shower', a ceremony of washing the idols of Taungbyon brothers. The general procedure starts with taking the two statues from the palace to the place of the event where the statues are washed alongside the washing and cleaning of the nats' items like betel cups and boxes. They are carried on the royal palanquin (ဝေါတော်) by men of guardian militia. This procession is led by the nat chieftain, the dignitaries, gong players to play music, and lines of guards dressed up as the army of the king Anawrahta. On reaching the pavilion where the ritual will take place, the palanquin is left at the entrance and the palace guardians shower the two statues on the altar, then changes the clothes. Libation and other offerings are made as part of the ritual. Afterwards, on their return to the palace, the paying-respect of the two brothers' idols to the Buddha is carried out by rocking the palanquin back and forth in the direction of the pagoda, called U Taik (ဦးတိုက်), for a certain time.

The fifth day is merely called 'Enthronement' because the two effigies have come back to their nat palace on the day of the ritual shower. Only mediums' dance reigned throughout the day.

=== Hunting hares ===
Hunting of the hares or rabbits is a ritual in remembrance of the two brothers' hare hunting during their lifetime. They used to hunt hares or rabbits and stopped at a house of a village for drinking water and having something to eat during the trip. Then the old fellow (Note: The book 'Burma at the turn of the twenty-first century' described the old fellow is an old woman) offered them roasted hares and toddy palm juice so the brothers, in return, invited him to pay a visit to their place, so goes the folklore. Since then, the generations of the old man (maybe the villagers from Natywakon village) have had to come to offer the nats the roasted hares.

It is celebrated on the thirteenth day (Note: The book 'Burma at the turn of the twenty-first century' mentioned 'Hare Hunting ritual' is on the fourteenth day.) of Wagaung, the sixth ritual day of the festival. On the day, leading a group of villagers and carrying two sacrificial hares, one in each hand, a young man chosen for this task presents them to the nat palace through a special ritual program, in which they have to walk around the palace seven times in an anti-clockwise direction from the top view after their arrival. During the turning around the palace, they also scream obscenities so some mediums are likely to close their doors when they pass by.

It is significant that the young male villagers of Natywakon must be those who shout obscenities and do the rebellious side of the two brothers because the nat brothers are known to them as drunkards and rowdies. Following this stage, the group stop in a shed, where the young man mentioned above swings the hares back and forth seven times in the direction of the brothers' idols, then the hares are given to the pavilion dignitaries, who come down the steps of the palace, go into the shed, where they do the same ritual as the young man has done, and up the steps and finally enter the palace. Melford Spiro described that the process of coming down the steps and up the steps is performed seven times too. The hares are offered to the two brothers in the palace.

According to Skidmore, the roasted hares are prepared as a salad and eaten by the dignitaries to represent an acquisition of subversive aspects and similar supernatural powers of the two brothers.

=== Felling Trees ===
'Felling trees' represents that the two brothers of Taungbyone and the local people disapprove of the other tree-guardian nat who caused the death of king Anawrahta according to legend. It is thus a symbolic retaliation against the tree-guardian nat. The tree is traditionally considered to be Htein, a large hardwood tree bearing winged-fruit pods (Nauclea parviflora). (Note: Myanmar language commission defines the tree 'Htein' as Nauclea parviflora) The Glass Palace Chronicle, however, mentions the legendary account of how king Anawrahta was killed, in which the nat who put the king to death is a lein tree-spirit.

The name Felling Htein Trees or Htein Tree-cutting (ထိမ်ခုတ်) is traditionally used and held on the fourteenth day of the month but the symbolic objects to be cut down are not actually trees; just two large branches are erected somewhere in the palace compound in advance. On the ritual day, water is first poured on the ground around the tree and some dignitaries come out and circumambulate the tree, holding the swords. As a final step, the nat chieftain stands alone and suddenly cuts the top of the branch with his sword. He quickly runs into the palace holding the piece he cut from the branch. The crowd jump on the remains of the branch and struggle and fight with one another to get a piece, no matter how small it is. The branch is torn to bits and gone. The piece of the branch is believed to bring good luck and good harvests if buried in the fields.

=== The last events ===
It is the full moon day when two hundred Buddhist monks are invited to offer a meal, on which the income got from the paddy fields owned by the two brothers is spent.

As the last event of the festival, on the night of the full moon day, an event of giving the send-off for a famous nat called Pakhanmin U Min Kyaw is held. U Min Kyaw nat is one of the significant that belongs to the pantheon of '37' nats and a popular solo dance performed in honour of him, known as 'bets on the cock fights', is renowned among the nat-dance and his specific festival is held during the month Tabaung, Guni village (ကူနီရွာ) near Pakhan in Magway Region.

After the good send-off for the U Min Kyaw nat, the festival is said to be over. The next morning, the first waning day of Wagaung, the last ritual of gilding gold foils to the two statues of the brothers is held.

== Organizers and participants ==
Among nat festivals, this festival is the most important and the model for all the others. More importantly, as it is held beyond the regional level due to the large crowd of people coming from different parts of the country for their reasons, it needs great organization, which falls within two domains: the two pagodas and the nat palace. The trustee of the pagodas controls and runs some sites and temporary infrastructure like stalls, theaters, as well as the pagodas' compound.

Next to them lies the nat palace surrounded by a large open space. The nat palace is run by its guardians (နတ်ထိန်း), who say they are descendants of the two Chinese princesses whom King Anawrahta appointed to guard the palace. So this family manages the whole domain of the nat. The profits and income from the festival are shared among the members of the family. There is also another major position, nat chieftain (နတ်အုပ်), which is the head of the ritual positions, to whom some mediums of important roles assisted.

These mediums, considered to be highest dignitaries, have their respective titles: "one who wears the baung" (a hat worn by ministers in the monarchy system) (ဗောင်းဆောင်းအမတ်); "a queen who wears the tho" ( a hat worn by queens in the monarchy system) (သိုးဆောင်းမိဖုရား). The number of ministers and queens has not been the same throughout the history of the festival. In the distant past, there were four queens and one minister. From after the Second World War to 1988, four queens and four ministers served as dignitaries. In 1995 the number went up to eighteen and then the number started to decline.

There are various types of mediums, in which the small number of chosen mediums is only allowed to perform in the nat palace. The large number of ordinary mediums has no right to perform there and has to find lodging outside of the nat palace's compound.

For some of those who have no traditional place in the main nat palace, secondary palaces have been built since about 1985, dedicated to the other nat among the Burmese pantheon of '37' nats.
