= Shwe Hpyin Naungdaw =

Burmese deity

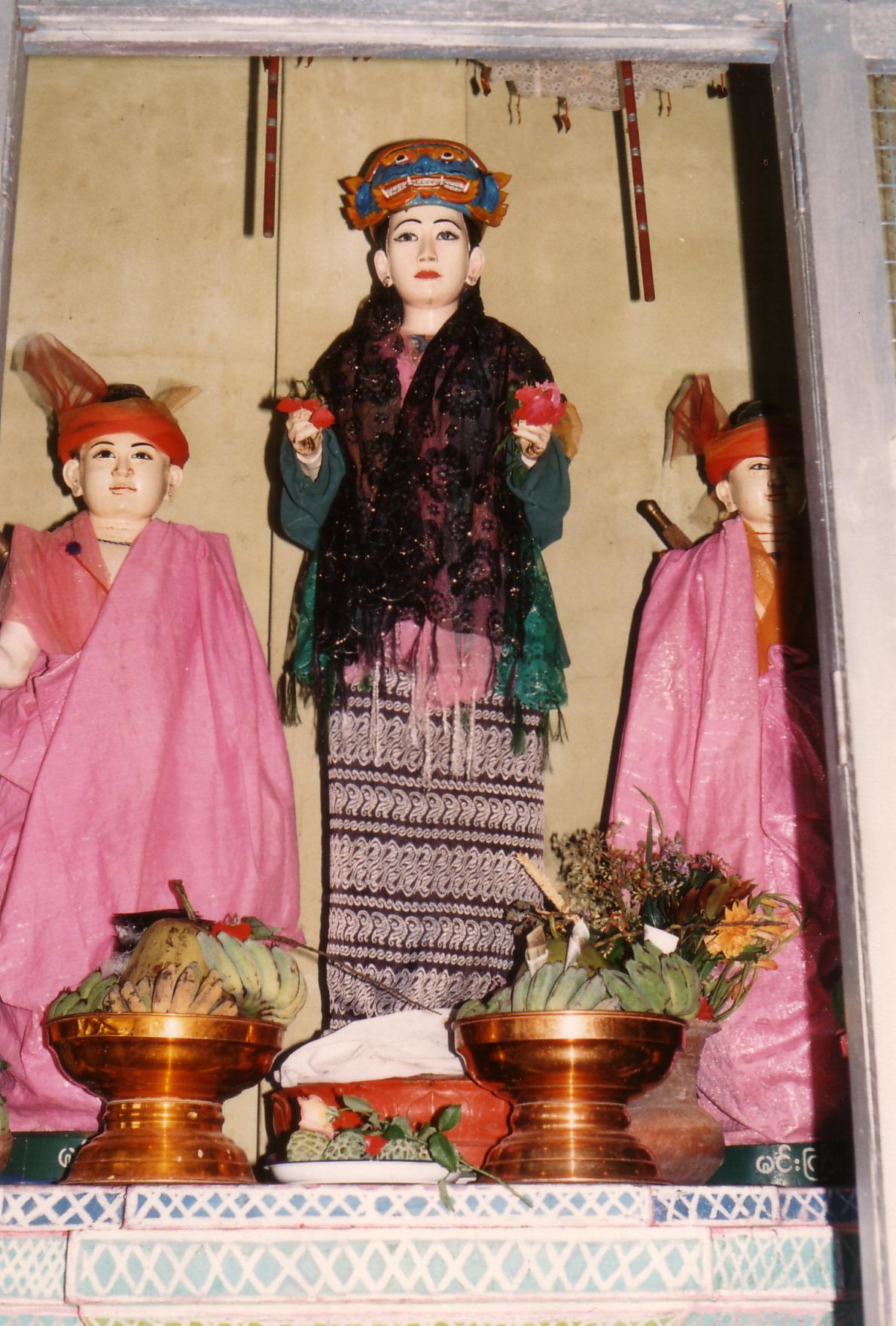
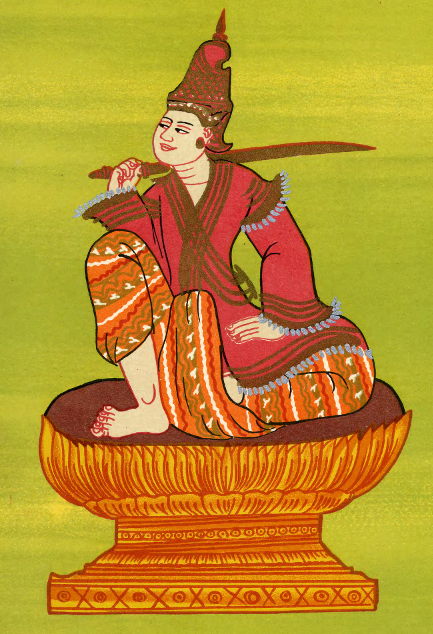
Left (A statue of Shwe Hpyin Naungdaw to the right of his mother, Me Wunna.) Right (A depiction of Shwe Hpyin Naungdaw)

Shwe Hpyin Naungdaw (ရွှေဖျင်းနောင်တော် [ʃwèbjɪ́ɰ̃ nàʊɰ̃dɔ̀]; lit. 'Goldpot the Elder'), also called Shwe Hpyin Gyi (ရွှေဖျင်းကြီး [ʃwèbjɪ́ɰ̃ dʑí]) or Min Gyi (မင်းကြီး [mɪ́ɰ̃ dʑí]), is one of the 37 nats in the official pantheon of Burmese nats. He is the elder brother of Shwe Hpyin Nyidaw and the son of Popa Medaw, another nat. He and his brother Shwe Hpyin Nyidaw are the subject of Myanmar's largest Nat festival- the six-day annual Taungbyone festival. Worshippers of this nat avoid consumption of pork, as Shwe Hpyin Gyi's father, Byatta, is believed to have been an Indian Muslim.

== Legend ==
The Shwe Hpyin Brothers served under King Anawrahta as warriors and as agents infiltrating the enemy's inner circle. According to legend, they successfully infiltrated the Chinese King of Gandalaraj Utibua's bodyguards to draw three lines with white lime on the king's body and write the threatening message on the wall, scaring the Chinese into peace and to send a tooth relic of the Buddha to Bagan.

They were killed for neglecting their duty to provide a brick each thus leaving gaps in Taungbyone Pagoda, which was built by King Anawrahta. After death, the brothers became spirits and manifested themselves in front of King Anawrahta, requesting apaing-za (possession) of territory. Responding to their plea, King Anawrahta granted them possession of Taungbyon.

== Worship ==
They are portrayed on pedestals, one lying down and the other upright with his sword shouldered arrogantly.

The largest Nat festival in Myanmar is the Taungbyone Festival, celebrated annually for six days in Taungbyone village near Mandalay. The festival pays tribute to the Shwe Hpyin brothers. Thousands of festive worshippers gather for the event, engaging in dance with spirit mediums, enjoying roadside snacks, and shopping for souvenirs. Muslims in the area also celebrate the memory of the brothers, but do not partake in the worship and hold their celebration on a different date to the Taungbyone festival.
