= Shwe Hpyin Nyidaw =

Burmese deity

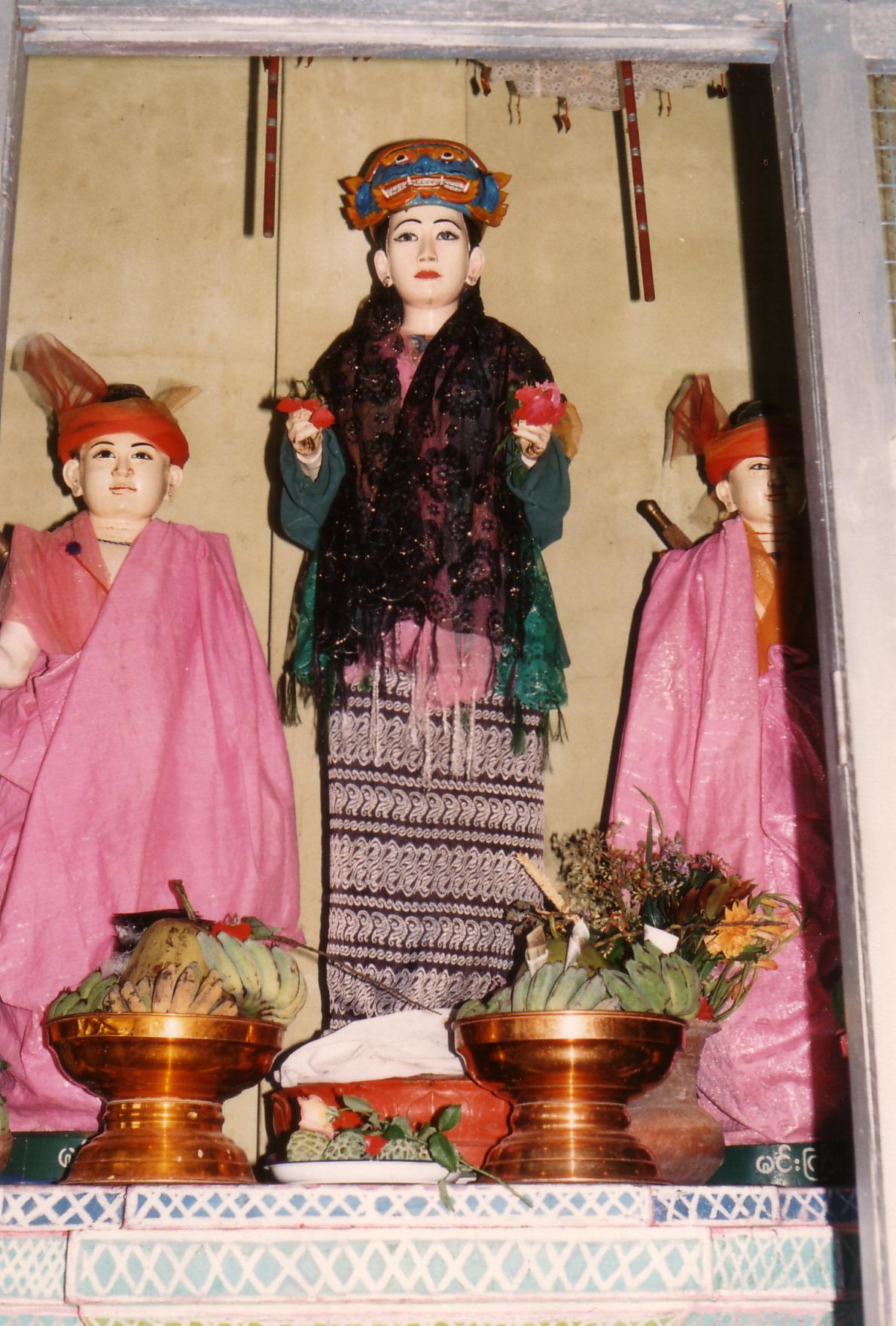
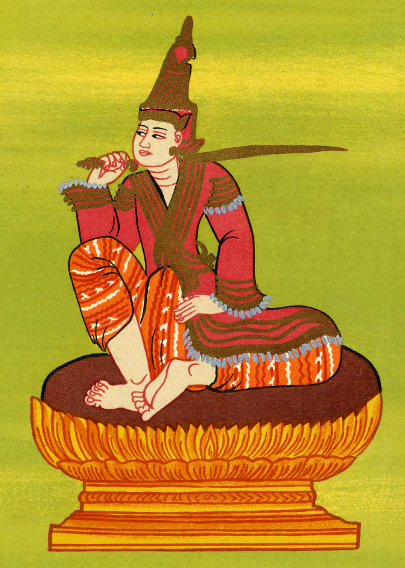
Left (A statue of Shwe Hpyin Naungdaw to the right of his mother, Me Wunna.) Right (A depiction of Shwe Hpyin Nyidaw)

Shwe Hpyin Nyidaw (Burmese: ရွှေဖျင်းညီတော်, pronounced [ʃwèbjɪ́ɰ̃ ɲìdɔ̀]; lit. 'Goldpot the Younger'), also called Shwe Hpyin Nge (ရွှေဖျင်းငယ်, IPA: [ʃwèbjɪ́ɰ̃ ŋɛ̀]) or Min Lay (မင်းလေး, IPA: [mɪ́ɰ̃ lé]), is one of the 37 nats in the official pantheon of Burmese nats.

He and his brother Shwe Hpyin Naungdaw are the subject of Myanmar's largest Nat festival- the six-day annual Taungbyone festival. Worshippers avoid consumption of pork, as Shwe Hpyin Nyidaw's father, Byatta, is believed to have been an Indian Muslim.

== Legend ==
Together known as Shwe Hpyin Nyinaung (Brothers) or Taungbyon Min Nyinaung (Brother Lords of Taungbyon), he and his brother Shwe Hpyin Naungdaw were sons of Byatta, the royal messenger, and Me Wunna, a flower-eating ogress from Mount Popa, during the reign of King Anawrahta of Bagan. The Shwe Hpyin brothers served under Anwarahta as warriors and as agents infiltrating the enemy's inner circle. According to legend, they successfully infiltrated the Chinese King of Gandalaraj Utibua's bodyguards to draw three lines with white lime on the king's body and write the threatening message on the wall, scaring the Chinese into peace and to send a tooth relic of the Buddha to Bagan. They were killed for neglecting their duty to provide a brick each thus leaving gaps in Taungbyone Pagoda, which was built by King Anawrahta. After death, the brothers became spirits and manifested themselves in front of King Anawrahta, requesting apaing-za (possession) of territory. Responding to their plea, King Anawrahta granted them possession of Taungbyon. Me Wunna died of a broken heart after Byatta was killed and later their sons were taken away on the king's orders. She became a nat known as Popa Medaw (Mother of Popa).

Shwe Hpyin Nyidaw developed a crush on Ma Shwe U, who was exceptionally pretty and frequently visited her village. He proposed, but she refused, leading to Shwe Hpyin Nyidaw harboring resentment. After the execution of the Shwe Hpyin brothers, who then became nats, Shwe Hpyin Nyidaw's longing for Ma Shwe U endured even in the realm of spirits. Later, as Ko Yin Maung, the husband of Ma Shwe U, journeyed down a wooden raft to the upper Meza area, Shwe Hpyin Nyidaw confessed his love to her again. However, when she didn't reciprocate, he ordered his mount tiger to kill her, and she became a nat after a violent death. The enmity persisted until they transformed into spirits. During the Taungbyone Festival, when the statues of the Shwe Hpyin brothers are taken to the river for the royal bathing ceremony, they pass by the road next to the shrine of Ma Shwe U. Consequently, the shrine's attendants must cover it. It is believed that if the shrine of Ma Shwe U is not securely veiled with a long shawl, the statue of Ma Shwe U will automatically turn to the other side.

== Worship ==
They are portrayed on pedestals, one lying down and the other upright with his sword shouldered arrogantly. Worshippers of this nat avoid consumption of pork, as Shwe Hpyin Gyi's father, Byatta, is believed to have been an Indian Muslim.

The largest Nat festival in Myanmar is the Taungbyone Festival, celebrated annually for six days in Taungbyone village near Mandalay. The festival pays tribute to the Shwe Hpyin brothers. Thousands of festive worshippers gather for the event, engaging in dance with spirit mediums, enjoying roadside snacks, and shopping for souvenirs. The village has about 7,000 nat shrines, nearly 2,000 of them elaborate ones dedicated to the Shwe Hpyin Brothers. Muslims in the area also celebrate the memory of the brothers, but do not partake in the worship and hold their celebration on a different date to the Taungbyone festival.
