= Byatta =

Burmese sailor (11th century)

- ဗျတ္တ
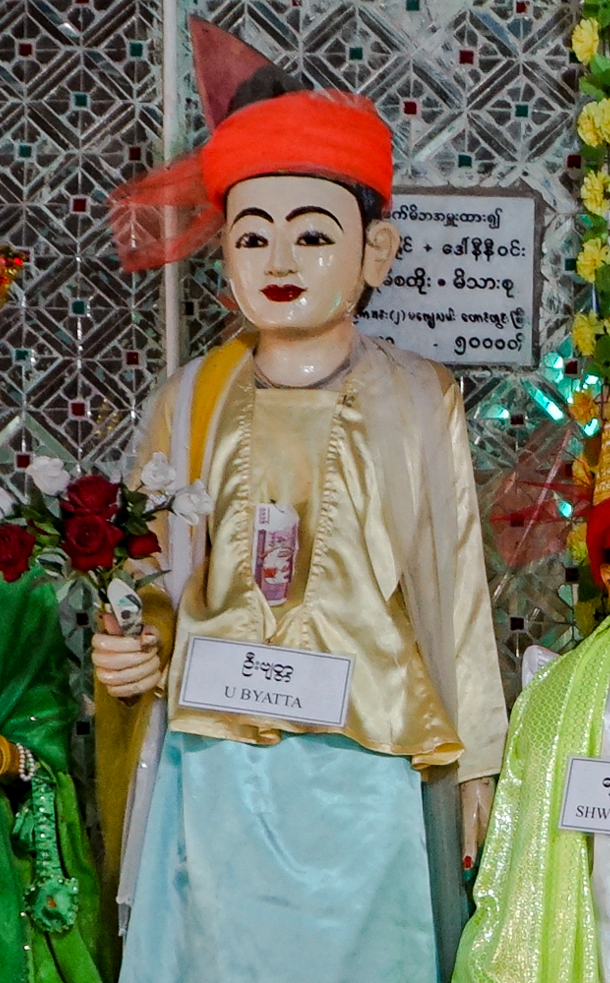
- Statue of Byatta at a shrine in Mount Popa
- Military career
- Allegiance: Pagan Dynasty
- Branch: Royal Burmese Army
- Service years: 1050s
- Conflicts: Pagan's conquest of Lower Burma

Byatta (Burmese: ဗျတ္တ, pronounced [bjaʔta̰]) was a senior commander in the Royal Army of King Anawrahta. He was a seaman, who joined Anawrahta's service after having shipwrecked at Thaton. He fathered two sons by a floral ogress from Popa district. The sons Shwe Hpyin Gyi and Shwe Hpyin Nge later entered the pantheon of Burmese nats as Shwe Hpyin Brothers.

== Origin ==
The Muslim traders were shipwrecked off Thaton and two brothers among them reached the city riding a plank, which drifted ashore near Thaton. They were known as Byatwi and Byatta. (Note: Melford Spiro described their names, Byatwi and Byatta as Abraham and Ibrahim in his book) Upon reaching the shore, they took refuge in the monastery, in which an abbot resided, venerated by King Manuha of Thaton Kingdom. The monk took care of and kept them near him.

One day, in the absence of the monk, the two brothers cooked and ate the body of the dead Zawgyi, a hermit-like being with supernatural power and alchemist that had been found by chance in the forest, preserved by the monk for medicine, which could serve both the elixir of life and magical power. They gained extraordinary powers. Such news spread out across the kingdom and finally reached into the ear of the king, who got worried sick. He thus ordered his men to capture them. The king's men seized and killed Byatwi, then dismembered his body and buried those parts around the city wall as a protective charm against the enemies who might attack and seize the city.

Byatta nevertheless, escaped and could flee to Bagan, where he served King Anawrahta, who later appointed him as his 'flower officer' for his superhuman strength. He rode his steed daily to get to Mount Popa over 30 miles south of Bagan, gather and offer flowers to the king when returned. He and a girl named Me Wunna on the mountain (legend says she is a floral ogress living on the mountain) fell in love with each other and begot two sons, known as the Shwe Hpyin Brothers.
