= Popa Medaw =

Goddess worshipped in Mount Popa, Myanmar

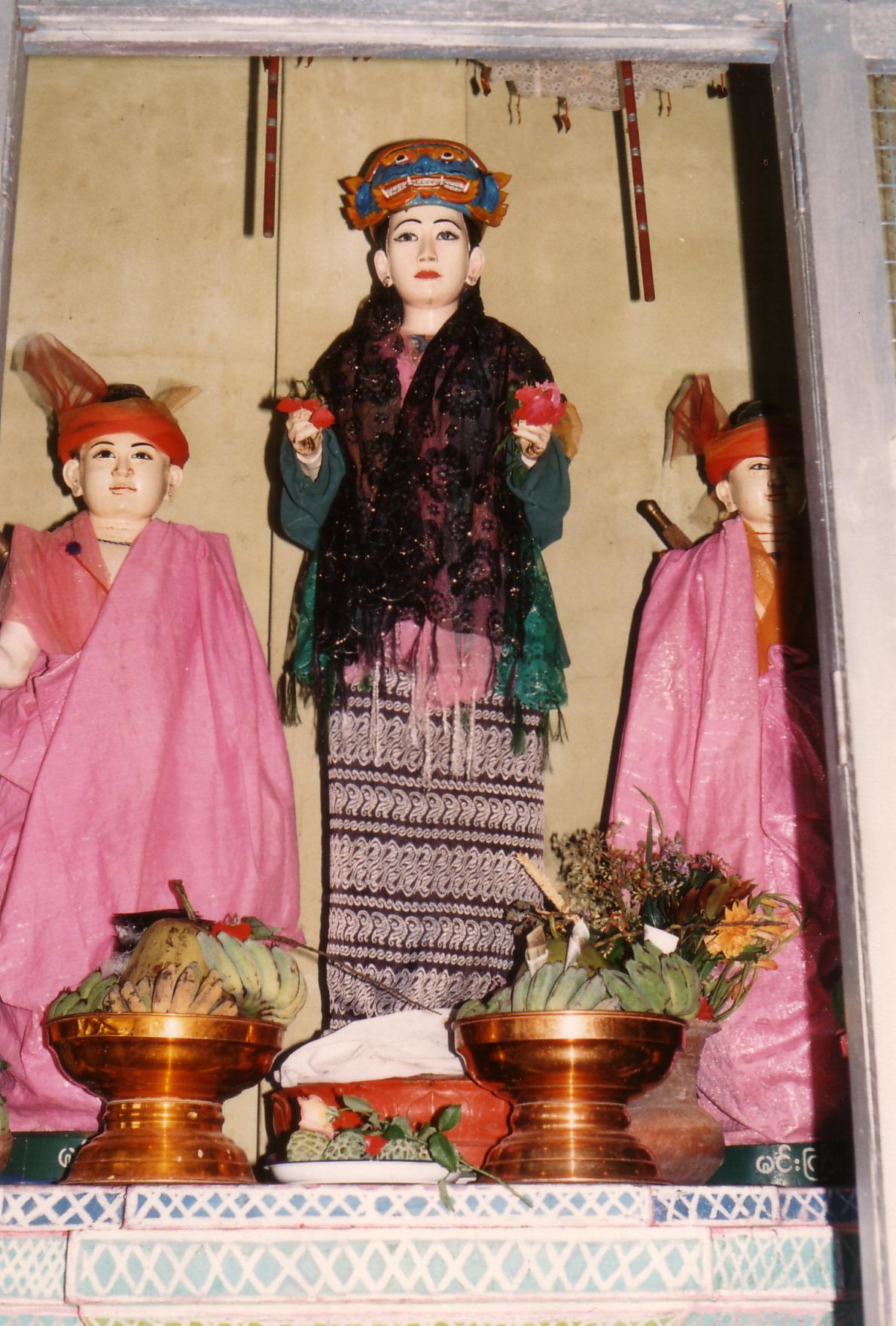
Mei Wunna flanked by her two sons.

Popa Medaw (Burmese: ပုပ္ပားမယ်တော်; lit. 'Queen-Mother of Popa or Lady of Popa', also known as Me Wunna ; Burmese: မယ်ဝဏ္ဏ) is a nat of Myanmar. She is a flower-eating yakshini and the mother of the Shwe Hpyin ('Inferior Gold') brothers Shwe Hpyin Naungdaw and Shwe Hpyin Nyidaw. Although not an official member of the 37 nat pantheon, which is based on her domain and namesake of Mount Popa, she is seen as an important nat in the Burmese spirit world. Popa Medaw is also called Mei Wunna ('Miss Gold').

== Story ==
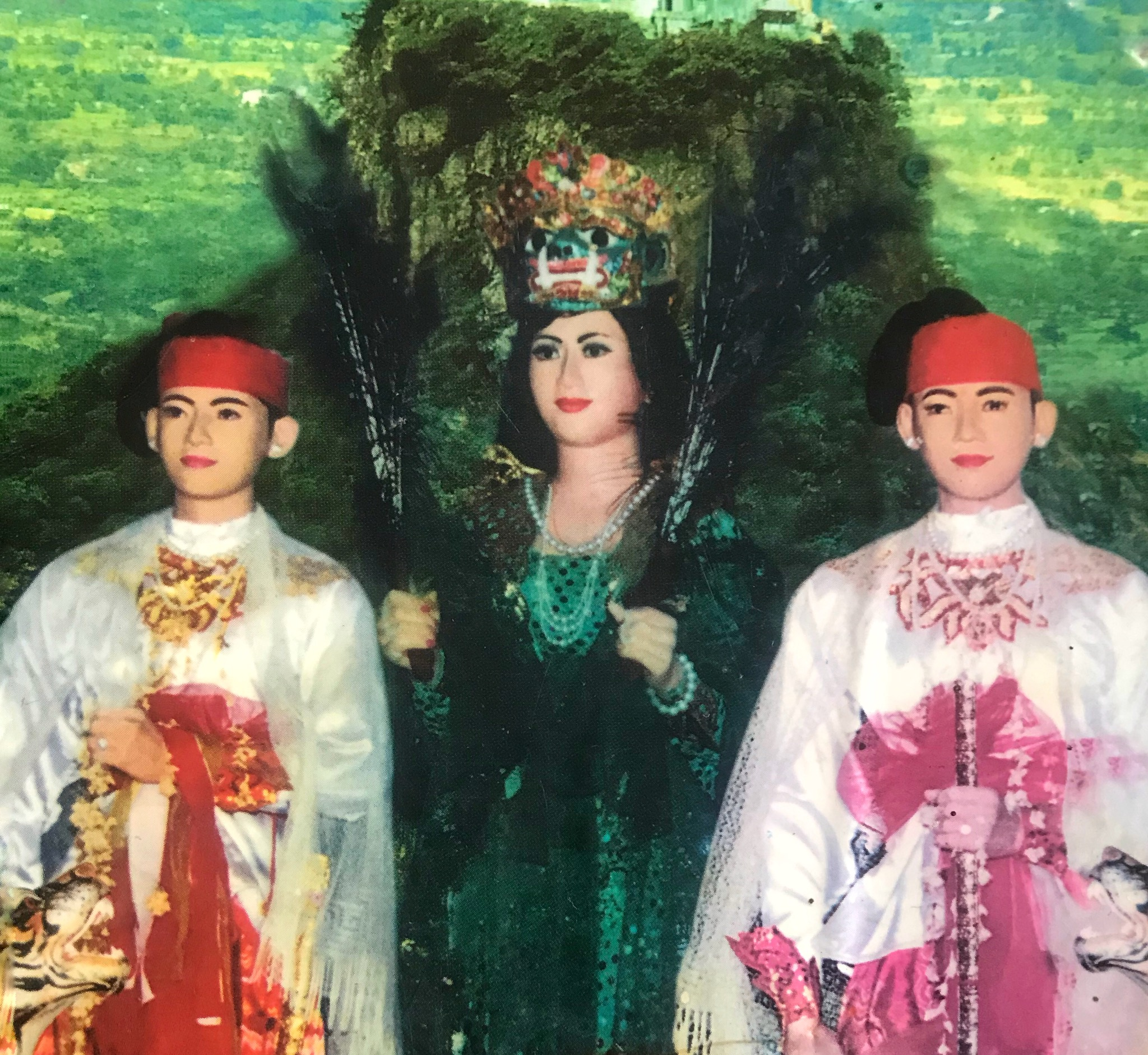
Statues of Popa Medaw with her two sons, Shwe Hpyin Naungdaw and Shwe Hpyin Nyidaw.

Mei Wunna was a flower-eating ogress of Mount Popa, an extinct volcano 50 kilometres (31 mi) southeast of Bagan. The word Popa is derived from the Pali word for flower. According to legend, King Anawrahta of Bagan ordered Byatta, a mythical person of Indian descent endowed with supernatural powers upon consumption of an inanimate Zawgyi (Burmese alchemist), to fetch fresh flowers ten times daily from Mount Popa. Byatta fell in love with Mei Wunna and eventually conceived the two brothers, Shwe Hpyin Naungdaw and Shwe Hpyin Nyidaw. Me Wunna died of a broken heart after Byatta was killed and later their sons were taken away on the king's orders. She became a nat known as Popa Medaw (Mother of Popa).

Upon the glorification of the two brothers into the 37 Nat Pantheon, the status of Mei Wunna was raised and she became the Queen-Mother of Popa. As her title suggests, she has dominion over Mount Popa.

== See also ==
- Nat (spirit)°
- Mount Popa
- Bagan
- Mythical creatures in Burmese folklore
