= Taungbyon =

Village in Mandalay Region, Myanmar

- Village
- Location in Myanmar
- Coordinates: 22.1°N 96.1°E
- Country: Myanmar
- Division: Mandalay Region
- District: Aungmyethazan District
- Township: Madaya Township

Taungbyon is a village in Madaya Township of Mandalay Region, Myanmar. It is known as the site of the Taungbyone Festival, which is the largest and best-known nat festival in Myanmar. During most of the year, it is a small village, but during the festival a large temporary infrastructure pops up to accommodate the large crowds in attendance. Taungbyon was historically important under the Bagan kingdom, when it was part of a series of forts along the Irrawaddy River and may have been a royal domain.

== Name ==
The older form of the name is Tonplon (တောင်ပြုံး), which means "eroded mound".

== Geography ==
Taungbyon is located about 10 km north of Mandalay, on the east bank of the Shweta chaung (stream).

== History ==
A dozen Bagan-era forts exist within 5 km of Taungbyon, including one at Taungbyon itself. These forts are all located east of the Irrawaddy River; another series of forts and canals exists on the west side. Based on the dense concentration of forts, along with numerous inscriptions recording donations by members of the royal family in the area (two of these inscriptions refer to a "king's dike"), historians have proposed that Taungbyon was a royal domain at the time. According to Elizabeth Moore, the geographical location of these features likely indicates that this whole system of forts was meant to monitor the river.

As of 1897, Taungbyon had about 350 houses and a population of about 1,500 people, who mostly worked in agriculture.

== Culture ==
Taungbyon is known for its nat (spirit) festival honouring the legendary brothers Min Gyi and Min Lay, who are said to have been sons of Mae Wunna (the tutelary goddess of Mount Popa) who served at Anawrahta's court. The Taungbyon festival is the largest and most important nat festival in Myanmar, and the accompanying commercial activity is an important part of the village's economy. It became particularly important after the royal capital was moved to Mandalay in 1857 (because of its proximity to the new capital).

There are technically three annual festivals in Taungbyon honouring the Taungbyon brothers: one is in December, one in March, and one in August. The one in August is the most significant and is the one usually referred to.

Taungbyon is a relatively sleepy village apart from the festival times, but it transforms during the main festival to accommodate the large crowds, with all available space used to house temporary festival infrastructure. Temporary bamboo housing is set up, stalls for vendors are auctioned one month before the festival (with the proceeds going to the pagodas' maintenance), and showers are set up. East of the pagodas is the "nat palace", which consists of two pavilions: one is where the statues of the nats are kept all year, and the second is where ritual showering of them takes place. The nat palace belongs to a hereditary family of "palace guardians" (nan-dein), who organise the festival, rent out spaces to mediums, and collect offerings from both villagers and mediums. The palace guardian families are the main beneficiaries of the festival's income, and they closely guard their role in the festival's organisation, although this is counterbalanced by the presence of "secondary" nat palaces as well as the status of the mediums. Nine of the secondary palaces, located along the road leading to the canal and river, are considered traditional because they are dedicated to secondary characters in the Taungbyon brothers' legend. The others mainly proliferated beginning in the mid-1980s and are considered "additional" instead of traditional because they are dedicated to other nats not related to the Taungbyon brothers' legend.

There are also two main pagodas in the village, the Hsutaungbyay pagoda and the later-built Hsutaungya pagoda. Both face east. The Sudaungbyi pagoda is attributed to Anawrahta and draws large numbers of visitors from throughout the surrounding region. Since 1991, the two pagodas are managed by a pagoda association which is associated with nearby Madaya as well as with central government authorities. There are also 7 Buddhist monasteries in the village, which are also part of the pagoda association.
