= Zawgyi (alchemist) =

Mystical human sage

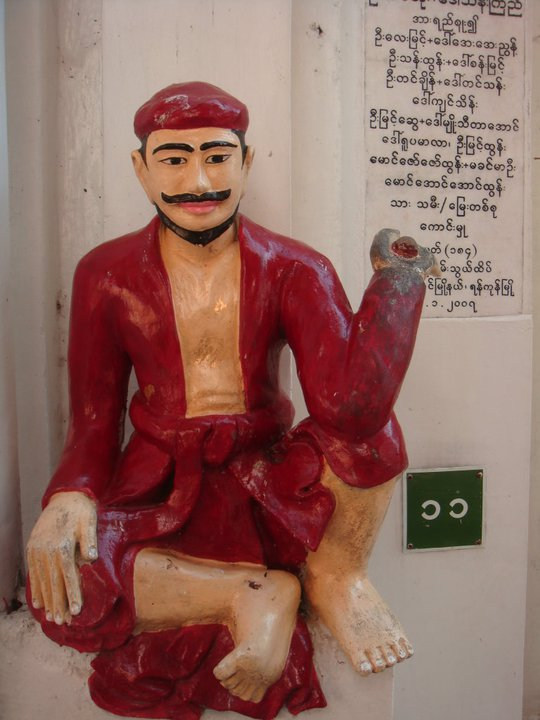
Zawgyi statue at Shwedagon Pagoda

A Zawgyi (Burmese: ဇော်ဂျီ) is a semi-immortal human alchemist and mystic with supernatural powers, often depicted with a magic wand and a red hat. Zawgyi is one of the prominent supernatural figures in Burmese mythology and folklore.

== Legend and powers ==
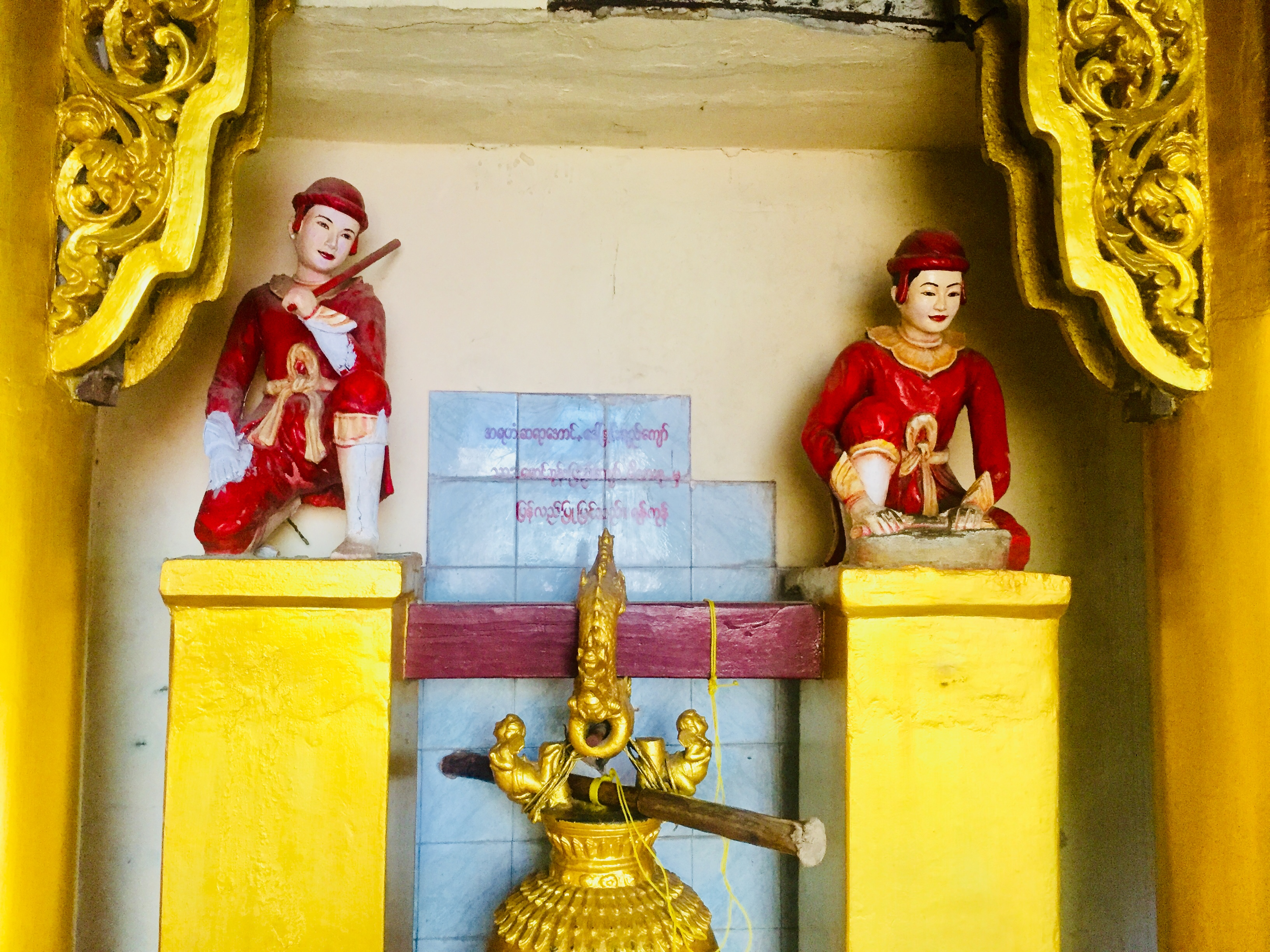
Zawgyi statues from Kyaikkhami Pagoda

The Zawgyi is said to possess supernatural powers such as flying through the air, traveling beneath the earth and oceans, and performing acts of divination, necromancy, and resurrection. He dwells alone in Himavanta, an invisible mythical forest deep within the Himalaya Mountains, where he gathers herbs for magical purposes. After years of searching, he is believed to have obtained the mythical Philosopher's stone, thereby attaining Zawgyihood.

With a touch of his magic wand, the Zawgyi can bring to life "illusory females" (Thuyaung-mèý) from Nariphon (Thuyaung fruit trees), which bear female-shaped fruits, to fulfill his desires. His powers are also said to come from medicines derived from trees, roots, tubers, bulbs of the deep forest, and a legendary ball of mercury believed to possess supernatural properties. Zawgyis spend their lives searching for herbs to heal suffering humans and to prolong life. Their magic wand is used to grind medicinal herbs and roots, and round flat stones found in remote places are often believed to be Zawgyi grinding stones. The Zawgyi always carries a staff, which he uses while walking, especially when navigating rugged mountain paths.

The Zawgyi practices alchemy in order to become a Weizza and attain immortality, along with lesser attainments such as supranormal powers. The ultimate goal of this practice is to achieve the timeless state of the Weizza, who awaits the appearance of the future Buddha, Metteya.

== Costume ==
Zawgyis are traditionally dressed in red from head to toe, wearing a red hat and carrying a magic wand. Only males can be Zawgyis, and a mustache is considered an optional part of the appearance. When a Zawgyi becomes a Weizza (Master Wizard, or "super Zawgyi"), his costume changes to white, and he wears a white Burmese longyi instead of trousers.

== Zawgyi dance and choreography ==
The Zawgyi dance is a joyful performance that depicts how the Zawgyi grinds medicines with his wand and ultimately creates a magic pill. Towards the end of the performance, the dancer often holds the wand horizontally and leaps over it to symbolize the Zawgyi’s success.
