= Vasily Omelianski =

Vasily L. Omelianski
- Василий Леонидович Омелянский
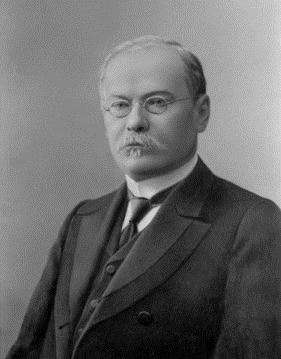
- Born: 10 March 1867; Poltava, Russian Empire
- Died: 21 April 1928 (aged 61); Gagra, Abkhazia
- Citizenship: Russian Empire, Soviet
- Education: University of Saint Petersburg
- Known for: Nitrogen cycle Cellulose fermentation Methanogenesis
- Scientific career
- Fields: Microbiology
- Workplaces: Institute of Experimental Medicine
- Doctoral advisor: Sergei Winogradsky

Vasily Leonidovich Omelianski (Vasilij Leonidovič Omeljanskij, Russian: Василий Леонидович Омелянский; 10 March 1867 – 21 April 1928) was a Russian microbiologist and author of the first original Russian text book on microbiology. He was the only student of Sergei Winogradsky and succeeded him as head of the department of General Microbiology at the Institute of Experimental Medicine in Saint Petersburg.

== Early life and education ==
Omelianski was the youngest son of a college teacher in Zhytomyr. In 1885 or 1886, Omelianski enrolled in the natural history division of the physico-mathematical faculty of the University of Saint Petersburg. During his studies he visited the lectures of D. I. Mendeleev and N. A. Menshutkin.

== Career ==
After finishing his studies with distinction in 1889 or 1890, he worked in the chemical laboratory of Menshutkin for further two years and published the first time. In 1891, financial difficulties forced Omelianski to work as laboratory chemist in a metallurgical factory in Southern Russia. However, two years later he became the assistant of S. N. Winogradsky, who hired him on recommendation of Menshutkin, at the new-founded Imperial Institute of Experimental Medicine. Omelianski supported Winogradskys work on nitrification. Later on he studied the fermentation of cellulose and did research on nitrogen fixation on his own.

In 1909, he published the textbook "Principles of Microbiology" (Основы микробиологии) which was the first original Russian textbook on microbiology and remained a standard work at Soviet universities till the 1950s. Omelianski had conceived this text from his lectures he held on a women's college since 1906 or 1909. In 1922, he published his second textbook "Practical Manual of Microbiology" (Практическое руководство по микробиологии) in which he spread the methodology of Winogradsky (using enrichment cultures) and the so-called "Delft school of microbiology" (founded by M. Beijerinck) in Russia. Since 1912 till his death he led the department of General Microbiology at the Institute of Experimental Medicine succeeding Winogradsky. As head of the department he edited the "Archive of Biological Sciences" (Архив биологических наук), the first biology journal publishing in Russian. In 1924, Omelianski became editor of the popular journal “Progress of biological chemistry” (Успехи биологической химии). The last textbook he could finish in 1927 was “Short course in general and soil microbiology” (Краткий курс общей и почвенной микробиологии).

In 1916, Omelianski became a corresponding member of the Russian Academy of Sciences and he was appointed to Doctor botanicus h. c. without examination in 1917. In 1923, he became of full member of the Russian Academy of Sciences. In 1926, he affiliated with the Society of American Bacteriologists and the Lombardic Academical Society.

== Personal life ==
Omelianski was married and had a daughter, Maria Vasilevna Stepanova (1901-1946, an ethnographer). During World War I, the Russian Revolution and Russian Civil War, Omelianski was able to stay in Saint Petersburg, while Winogradsky (as a rich landowner) had to escape. Possibly, he was saved by his poor bourgeois ancestry, his interest in the starving poor, his popular commitment by publishing Russian text books and journals and lecturing in a women’s college or thanks to the Bolsheviks scientific progress friendly stance. In springtime 1927, Omelianski travelled to the Pasteur Institute in Paris to visit his mentor Winogradsky. There he suffered a first heart attack. Omelianski had a second heart attack in December 1927 but could recover. During a vacation in Gagra (Abkhazia) he died on April 21, 1928. Omelianski was also a gifted chess player who entered into competitions as a student, a reportedly gifted portraitist and wrote several short-stories, four of which have since been stored in the archive at the Russian Academy of Sciences in St. Petersburg.

== Impact on methanogenesis research ==
Omelianski published only once in English on “aroma-producing microorganisms” in the American Journal of Bacteriology in 1923. However, today his international reputation is connected to microbial methanogenesis in syntrophic co-cultures. This is based on his French publication of 1916 on "methane fermentation of ethanol". Following this research, microbiologist Horace Barker isolated an ethanol-degrading microbe called Methanobacterium omelianskii. Barker had used the methodological approach of the "Delft school of microbiology" developed by Barkers mentors Albert Kluyver and Cornelis van Niel. In 1967, the renamed Methanobacterium omelianskii was specified as a co-culture of the ethanol-oxidizing S-organism and a methanogen, which uses hydrogen produced by its bacterial partner to reduce carbon dioxide to methane. Certainly, Omelianski was one of the founding fathers of methanogenesis research and the first scientist investigating methanogenic fermentation of cellulose and ethanol systematically. He even discovered hydrogen as a product of cellulose fermentation around 1900 but, of course, did not discover the concept of syntrophic electron transfer.
