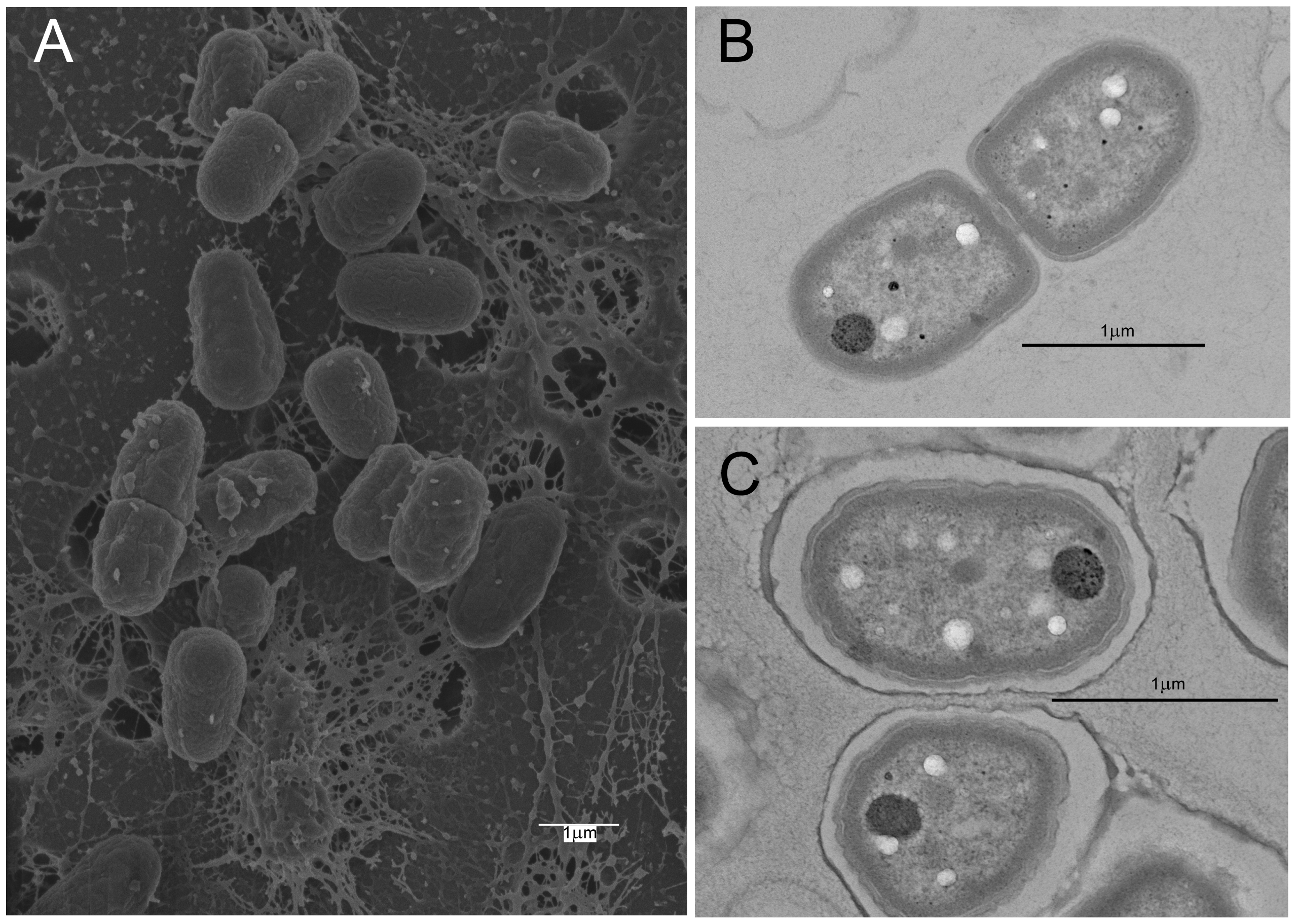
- Gloeobacter kilaueensis

Scientific classification
- Domain: Bacteria
- Kingdom: Bacillati
- Phylum: Cyanobacteriota
- Class: Cyanophyceae
- Order: Gloeobacterales
- Family: Gloeobacteraceae; Komárek et Anagnostidis
- Genus: Gloeobacter; Rippka, Waterbury, & Cohen-Bazire, 1974 [validated 2013]

Type species
- Gloeobacter violaceus Rippka, Waterbury & Cohen-Bazire, 1974 [validated 2013]

Species
- G. kilaueensis; G. morelensis; G. violaceus

= Gloeobacter =

Genus of bacteria

Gloeobacter is a genus of cyanobacteria. It is the sister group to all other photosynthetic cyanobacteria. Gloeobacter's order, Gloeobacterales, is unique among cyanobacteria in not having thylakoids, which are characteristic for all other cyanobacteria and chloroplasts. Instead, the light-harvesting complexes (also called phycobilisomes), that consist of different proteins, sit on the inside of the plasma membrane (among the cytoplasm). Subsequently, the proton gradient in Gloeobacter is created across the plasma membrane, whereas it forms across the thylakoid membrane in cyanobacteria and chloroplasts.

The whole genome of G. violaceus (strain PCC 7421) and of G. kilaueensis have been sequenced. Many genes for photosystem I and II were found missing, likely related to the fact that photosynthesis in these bacteria does not take place in the thylakoid membrane as in other cyanobacteria, but in the plasma membrane. There is also a genome for G. morelensis.

== Description ==
Gloeobacter violaceus produces several pigments, including chlorophyll a, β-carotene, oscillol diglycoside, and echinenone. The purple coloration is due to the relatively low chlorophyll content. G. kilaueensis grows with a few other bacteria as a purple-colored biofilm around 0.5 mm thick. Cultivated colonies are dark purple, smooth, shiny, and raised. G. kilaueensis is mostly unicellular, capsule-shaped, about 3.5×1.5 μm, and embedded in mucus. They divide over the width of the cell. Cells color gramnegative, and lack vancomycin resistance. They are not motile and do not glide. Growth ceases in complete darkness, so Gloeobacter is very likely obligatory photoautotrophic.

== Species and distribution ==
Gloeobacter violaceus was found on a limestone rock in the Swiss canton Obwalden. G. kilaueensis occurred within a lava cave at the Kilauea-caldera on Hawaii. It grew there at a temperature around 30 °C at very high humidity, with moisture condensing and dripping off the biofilm.

Gloeobacter could have split off from the other cyanobacteria between 3.7 and 3.2 billion years ago. The species of Gloeobacter may have branched 280 million years ago.

=== Phylogeny ===
120 marker proteins based GTDB 09-RS220

- Gloeobacter
  - G. kilaueaensis corrig. Saw et al. 2014
  - - G. violaceus Rippka, Waterbury & Cohen-Bazire 1974
    - - Aphanocapsa lilacina Miscoe and Johansen 2016
      - G. morelensis Saw, Cardona & Montejano 2021

Notes:

- GTDB has three more metagenome-only genera under Gloeobacteraceae, each with one species containing one genome.
- Aphanocapsa lilacina was published in 2016 to genus Aphanocapsa. The protologue is found in a copyrighted book, with no free online copies as of May 2025.

== Related groups ==
Anthocerotibacter panamensis, found in a sample of hornwort from a rainforest in Panama, also lacks thylakoids. It has very few of the genes that are required to perform photosynthesis, but is still able to perform it, very slowly. It may have been split from Gloeobacter about 1.4 Ga ago. This genus is officially a member of family Anthocerotibacteraceae within order Gloeobacterales.

GTDB RS226 concurs in assigning Anthocerotibacter to Gloeobacterales, but is not yet aware of the name "Anthocerotibacteraceae" for the family; it instead calls the family "FY9".

== See also ==
- List of bacteria genera
- List of bacterial orders
