= Citrate (Re)-synthase =

Class of enzymes

Identifiers
- EC no.: 2.3.3.3
- CAS no.: 9077-70-7

Databases
- IntEnz: IntEnz view
- BRENDA: BRENDA entry
- ExPASy: NiceZyme view
- KEGG: KEGG entry
- MetaCyc: metabolic pathway
- PRIAM: profile
- PDB structures: RCSB PDB PDBe PDBsum
- Gene Ontology: AmiGO / QuickGO
Search
- PMC: articles
- PubMed: articles
- NCBI: proteins

Citrate (Re)-synthase (EC 2.3.3.3) is an enzyme that catalyzes the chemical reaction

oxaloacetic acid
+
acetyl-CoA
H_{2}O
citric acid
+ Coenzyme A

The three substrates of this enzyme characterised from Clostridium kluyveri are oxaloacetic acid, acetyl-CoA, and water. Its products are citric acid and coenzyme A. The enzyme was found to have a mechanism dissimilar to that of the more common citrate synthase, since it introduces the acetyl group with stereospecificity for the re face of the oxaloacetic acid.

This enzyme belongs to the family of transferases, specifically those acyltransferases that convert acyl groups into alkyl groups on transfer. The systematic name of this enzyme class is acetyl-CoA:oxaloacetate C-acetyltransferase [thioester-hydrolysing, (pro-R)-carboxymethyl-forming]. Other names in common use include (R)-citrate synthase, Re-citrate-synthase, and citrate oxaloacetate-lyase [(pro-3R)-CH2COO→acetyl-CoA].
