= Mother goddess =

Goddess representing motherhood or fertility

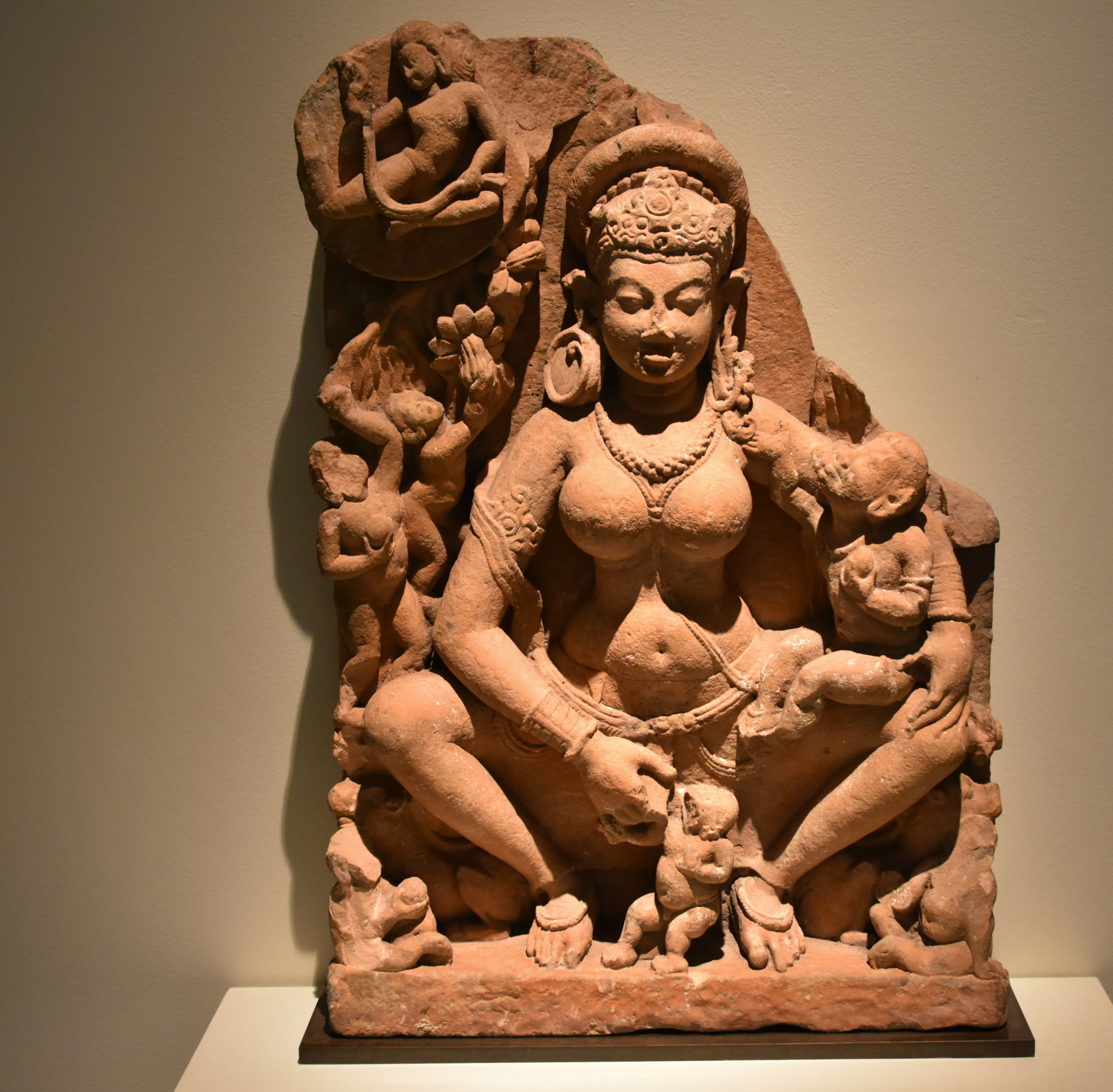
Mother Goddess sculpture from Madhya Pradesh or Rajasthan, India, 6th-7th century, in the National Museum of Korea, Seoul

A mother goddess is a major goddess characterized as a mother or progenitor, either as an embodiment of motherhood and fertility or fulfilling the cosmological role of a creator- and/or destroyer-figure, typically associated with the Earth, sky, and/or the life-giving bounties thereof in a maternal relation with humanity or other gods. When equated in this lattermost function with the earth or the natural world, such goddesses are sometimes referred to as the Mother Earth or Earth Mother, deity in various animistic or pantheistic religions. The earth goddess is archetypally the wife or feminine counterpart of the Sky Father or Father Heaven, particularly in theologies derived from the Proto-Indo-European sphere (i.e. from Dheghom and Dyeus). In some polytheistic cultures, such as the Ancient Egyptian religion which narrates the cosmic egg myth, the sky is instead seen as the Heavenly Mother or Sky Mother as in Nut and Hathor, and the earth god is regarded as the male, paternal, and terrestrial partner, as in Osiris or Geb who hatched out of the maternal cosmic egg.

== Excavations at Çatalhöyük ==
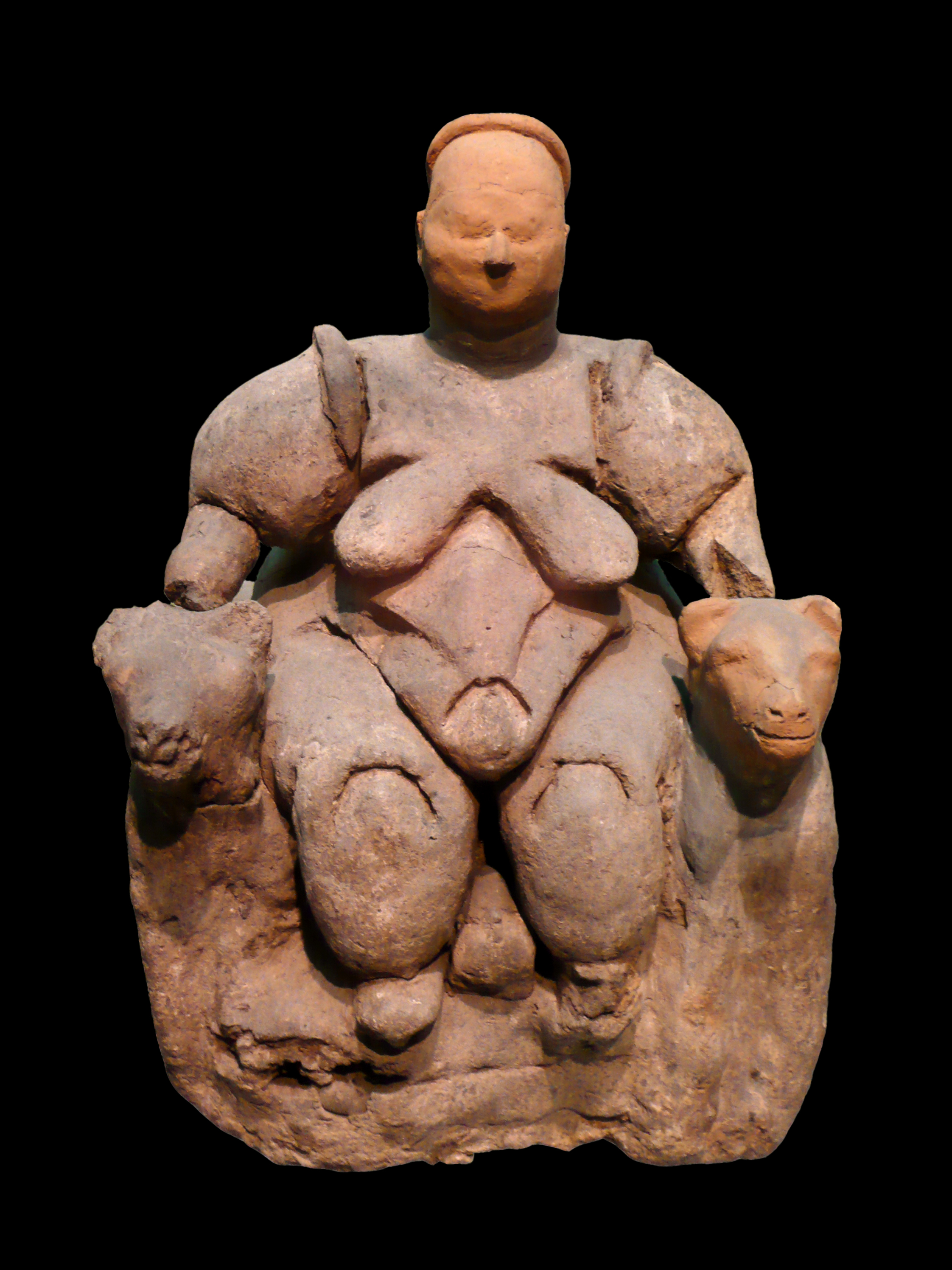
Seated Woman of Çatalhöyük

Between 1961 and 1965 James Mellaart led a series of excavations at Çatalhöyük, north of the Taurus Mountains in a fertile agricultural region of South-Anatolia. Striking were the many statues found here, which Mellaart suggested represented a Great goddess, who headed the pantheon of an essentially matriarchal culture. A seated female figure, flanked by what Mellaart describes as lionesses, was found in a grain-bin; she may have intended to protect the harvest and grain. He considered the sites as shrines, with especially the Seated Woman of Çatalhöyük capturing the imagination. There was also a large number of sexless figurines, which Mellaart regarded as typical for a society dominated by women. He wrote that "emphasis on sex in art is invariably connected with male impulse and desire." The idea that there could have been a matriarchy and a cult of the mother goddess was supported by archaeologist Marija Gimbutas. This gave rise to a modern cult of the Mother Goddess with annual pilgrimages being organized at Çatalhöyük.

Since 1993, excavations were resumed, now headed by Ian Hodder with Lynn Meskell as head of the Stanford Figurines Project that examined the figurines of Çatalhöyük. This team came to different conclusions than Gimbutas and Mellaart. Only a few of the figurines were identified as female and these figurines were found not so much in sacred spaces, but seemed to have been discarded randomly, sometimes in garbage heaps. This rendered a cult of the mother goddess in this location as unlikely. (Note: As an example, the publication by Meskell et al. (2008) of detailed data on the figurines from the site has transformed our understanding of these objects. In much earlier work and writing on the site, including by Mellaart, these objects were seen as representational and as religious, relating to a cult of the mother goddess. The work of the figurine team has thoroughly undermined this interpretation. In fact, when properly quantified, few of the figurines are clearly female. In addition, examination of their context of deposition shows that the objects are not in 'special' locations, but were discarded, often in middens. A study of the fabric of the figurines by Chris Doherty (pers. comm.) has shown that they are made of local marls and that they are unfired or low fired. Many have survived only because they were accidentally burned in hearths and fires. Thus all the evidence suggests that these objects were not in a separate religious sphere. Rather, it was the process of their daily production – not their contemplation as religious symbols – that was important. They gave meaning, at the everyday, low-intensity level, to subjectivities and to the social world that they helped imagine. - Hodder (2010))

== African religions ==
In Egyptian mythology, sky goddess Nut is sometimes called "Mother" because she bore stars and Sun god. Nut was thought to draw the dead into her star-filled sky, and refresh them with food and wine.

In Kongo religion, the Sky Mother, Nzambici, was the female counterpart of the Sky Father and Solar god, Nzambi Mpungu. Originally, they were seen as one spirit with one half male and the other half female. After the introduction of Christianity to Central Africa, the description of Nzambi changed to Creator God and Nzambici to his wife, "God the essence, the god on earth, the great princess, the mother of all the animals, and the mystery of the Earth."

== Hinduism ==
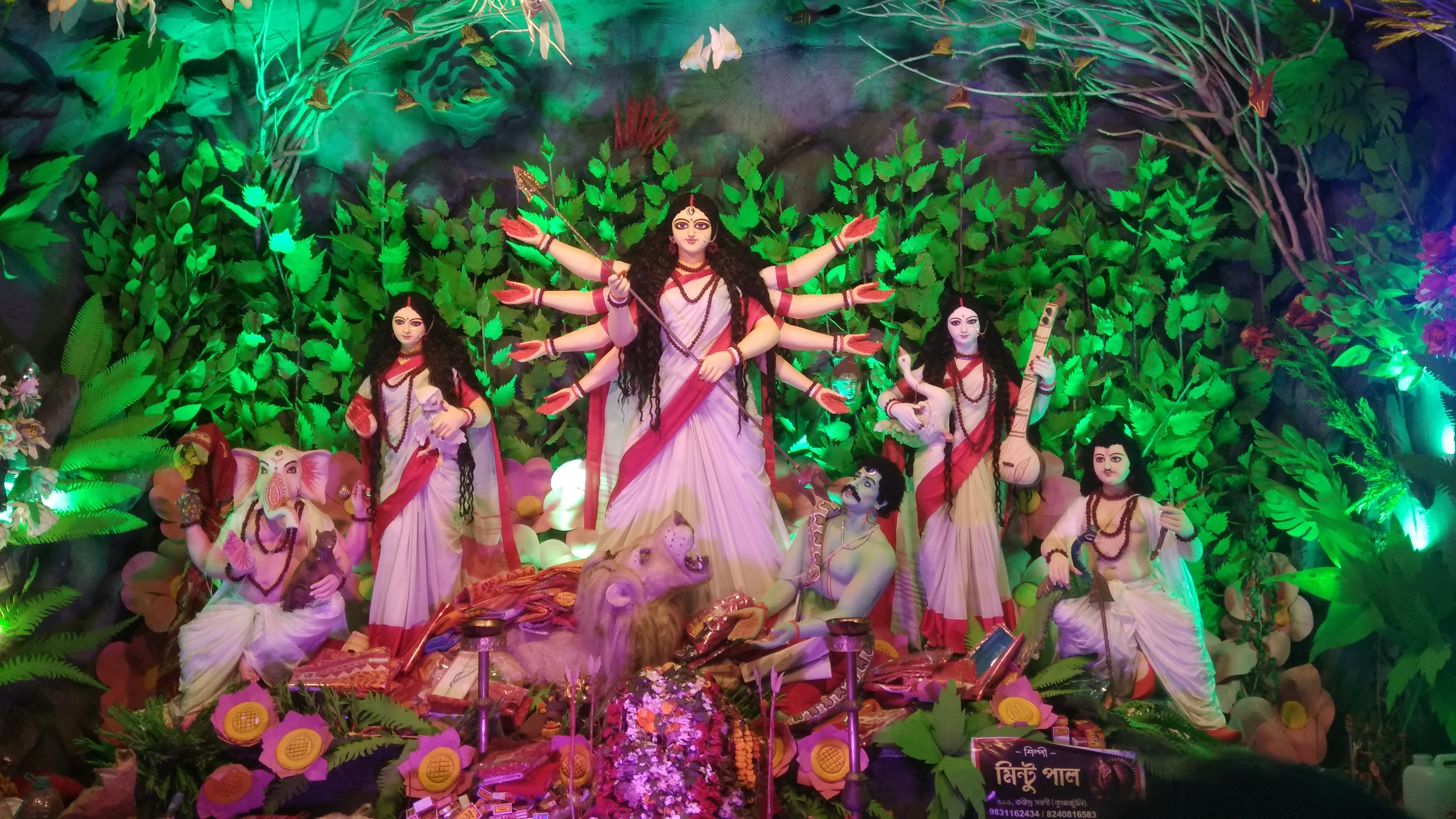
Hindu goddess Durga

Traditional Hindu mythology features matriarchal power in a central role, reflected in the powerful presence of the Mother goddess, who is diversely called Annapurna, Durga, Parvati, Mahadevi, Shakti, Kali or Mahakali. As Annapurna, she is the provisioner of food and nurturance; as Durga she destroys asuric or demonic elements that cannot be dealt by male gods; as Kali, in her dark mode, she is the erratic, fickle, chastening mother, associated with death and destruction as well as grace and rejuvenation. As Shakti or Mahadevi, known by the common name "Devi" (from the Sanskrit root "to shine"), she is the life-giving, generative power of the universe.

In Hinduism, Saraswati, Lakshmi, Radha, Parvati, Durga and other goddesses represents both the feminine aspect and the shakti (power) of the supreme being known as the Brahman. The divine mother goddess, manifests herself in various forms, representing the universal creative force. She becomes Mother Nature (Mula Prakriti), who gives birth to all life forms and nourishes them through her body. Ultimately she re-absorbs all life forms back into herself, or "devours" them to sustain herself as the power of death feeding on life to produce new life. She also gives rise to Maya (the illusory world) and to prakriti, the force that galvanizes the divine ground of existence into self-projection as the cosmos.

The Shakti sect is strongly associated with Samkhya, and Tantra Hindu philosophies and ultimately, is monist. The primordial feminine creative-preservative-destructive energy, Shakti, is considered to be the motive force behind all action and existence in the phenomenal cosmos. The cosmos itself is purusha, the unchanging, infinite, immanent, and transcendent reality that is the divine ground of all being, the "world soul". This masculine potential is actualized by feminine dynamism, embodied in multitudinous goddesses who are ultimately all manifestations of the one great mother. Shakti, herself, can free the individual from demons of ego, ignorance, and desire that bind the soul in maya (illusion). Practitioners of the Tantric tradition focus on Shakti to free themselves from the cycle of karma.

The worship of the mother deity can be traced back to early Vedic culture. The Rigveda calls the divine female power Mahimata (R.V. 1.164.33) which means "great mother".

== Christianity ==
The Council of Ephesus in 431 AD affirmed Mary as Theotokos (Greek: "God-bearer"), establishing her title as Mother of God in Christian theology. The council emphasized that, because Jesus Christ is both fully divine and fully human, Mary is the mother of the incarnate Word.

Mary occupies a central role in Christian devotion, particularly within the Catholic and Orthodox churches. While Protestants generally reject Marian devotion, Catholic and Orthodox theology maintains that veneration of Mary differs from worship of God, reserving adoration (latria) for the Trinity alone.

The earliest known prayer directed to Mary, the Sub Tuum Praesidium, dates to approximately the 3rd century and seeks her intercession and protection. The Hail Mary, originating in the 11th century, became a central element of the Rosary. Shrines and devotions such as Our Lady of Guadalupe, Our Lady of the Rosary, and Our Lady of Good Counsel are observed in diverse cultural contexts.

According to Catholic and Orthodox teaching, Mary’s life concluded with her body taken up into heaven (the Assumption in Western Christianity & the Dormition in Eastern Christianity). She is regarded as the foremost saint, who is believed by some Christians to continue intervening & interceding in the world through reported Marian apparitions.

Mary has not been described in Christian theology as a goddess or divine in her own right. Scholastic theology and Mariology consistently describe her as a created being, subordinate to and distinct from the Triune God.

In pre-Islamic Arabia, Collyridians were an unorthodox Christian denomination who reportedly worshipped Virgin Mary, by making burnt offerings of dough to her. Ancient Christians viewed the Collyridians as heretics, holding that Mary was only to be honoured, and not to be worshipped like the God-man of Christianity.

=== Latter Day Saint movement ===
In the Latter Day Saint movement, particularly the Church of Jesus Christ of Latter-day Saints, many adherents believe in a Heavenly Mother as the wife of God the Father. They are collectively referred to as Heavenly Parents. The theology varies, however, according to the Latter Day Saint denomination. Some believe in multiple Heavenly Mothers married to one Heavenly Father in a polygynous relationship.

=== Shakers ===
For Shakers, Holy Mother Wisdom "will come forth and be revealed in her true order; and will be known, even as the Eternal Father is known" (Divine Book of Holy and Eternal Wisdom; Part VI; Chapter 2; Verse 22).

== New religious movements ==
In Theosophy, the Earth goddess is called the "Planetary Logos of Earth".

The Mother Goddess, or Great Goddess, is a composite of various feminine deities from past and present world cultures, worshiped by modern Wicca and others broadly known as Neopagans. She is considered sometimes identified as a Triple Goddess, who takes the form of Maiden, Mother, and Crone archetypes. She is described as Mother Earth, Mother Nature, or the Creatress of all life. She is associated with the full moon and stars, the Earth, and the sea. In Wicca, the Earth Goddess is sometimes called Gaia. The name of the mother goddess varies depending on the Wiccan tradition. English historian Ronald Hutton, however, has forcefully stated that any use of the term "Mother-Goddess" can be accounted for, and disregarded, as the scholars and mythographers' own projection of the Virgin Mary onto the evidence and source data. More recently Hutton was criticized in a review for ignoring the evidence of numerous goddesses identified as either mothers or both virgin and mother in pre-Christian antiquity, in addition to providing no evidence or secondary citations with which to substantiate his own position.

Carl Gustav Jung suggested that the archetypal mother was a part of the collective unconscious of all humans; various adherents of Jung, most notably Erich Neumann and Ernst Whitmont, have argued that such an archetype underpins many of its own mythologies and may even precede the image of the paternal "father". Such speculations help explain the universality of such mother goddess imagery around the world.

In the Baháʼí Faith, Baha'u'llah uses the Mother as an attribute of Himself, the manifestation of God and the one "well-grounded in all knowledge": "And when He Who is well-grounded in all knowledge, He Who is the Mother, the Soul, the Secret, and the Essence thereof, revealeth that which is the least contrary to their desire, they bitterly oppose Him and shamelessly deny Him". Baha'u'llah further writes that "Every single letter proceeding out of the mouth of God is indeed a Mother Letter, and every word uttered by Him Who is the Well Spring of Divine Revelation is a Mother Word, and His Tablet a Mother Tablet."

Zahng Gil-jah is a South Korean woman, by the World Mission Society Church of God believed to be "God the Mother" (Korean: 어머니 하나님; RR: Eomeoni Hananim; Korean pronunciation: [ʌmʌɲi hanaɲim]). Church members may also call her "New Jerusalem Mother”, "Mother Jerusalem", or "Heavenly Mother".

== Prehistoric matriarchy debate ==
There is difference of opinion between the academic and the popular conception of the term Mother goddess. The popular view is mainly driven by the Goddess movement and reads that primitive societies initially were matriarchal, worshipping a sovereign, nurturing, motherly earth goddess. This was based upon the nineteenth-century ideas of unilineal evolution of Johann Jakob Bachofen. According to the academic view, however, both Bachofen and the modern Goddess theories are a projection of contemporary world views on ancient myths, rather than attempting to understand the mentalité of that time. (Note: The idea of the Mother Goddess, also called the Great Mother or Great Goddess, has dominated the imaginations of modern scholars in several fields. The image of the Mother Goddess with which we are familiar today has its modern genesis in the writings of Johann Jakob Bachofen. In 1861 Bachofen published his famous study Das Mutterrecht in which he developed his theory that human society progressed from hetaerism, characterized by unrestricted sexual relations, to matriarchy, in which women ruled society, and finally to the most advanced stage, patriarchy. Bachofen conceived of religious practice as progressing in a parallel manner from a belief in a mother goddess to a more advanced belief in a father god, associating belief in a mother deity with a primitive stage in the development of human society: “Wherever we encounter matriarchy, it is bound up with the mystery of the chthonian religion, whether it invokes Demeter or is embodied by an equivalent goddess” (Bachofen, 88). Bachofen believed that the matriarchal form of social organization derived from the maternal mystery religions (88-9). As we see with Bachofen, modern theories of the Mother Goddess have inevitably been shaped by modern cultural presuppositions about gender. Lynn Roller believes that “[m]any discussions of the Mother Goddess rely on modern projections ought to be, rather than on ancient evidence defining what she was” (Roller, 9). William Ramsay, the late nineteenth-century archaeologist, who was the first researcher to demonstrate that the principal deity of Phrygia was a mother goddess, drew heavily on Bachofen's theory (Roller, 12). Like Bachofen's, Ramsay's understanding of the national character of matriarchal pre-Phrygian society is based on contestable evidence and relies on stereotypically feminine characteristics; he describes matriarchal pre-Phrygian society as “receptive and passive, not self-assertive and active” (12). For Ramsay, this “feminine” character explains why this culture was conquered by the masculine, warlike Phrygians with their male deities. Thus, constructions of ancient matriarchal societies, which are inseparable from “a glorification of the female element in human life” (12), are suspiciously similar to modern stereotypes of the feminine that are not necessarily native to pre-Phrygian culture. Given these observations, Bachofen's repeated emphasis on the necessity of freeing oneself from the cultural prejudices of one's own time if one is to truly understand these ancient cultures takes on an ironic tone. It is not only Bachofen and Ramsay, but many others after them, who assume the stereotypical femininity of the Mother Goddess. Many of these conceptions of what a mother goddess ought to be stem from “the Judaeo-Christian image of the loving, nurturing mother subservient to her husband and closely bonded with her children” (Roller, 9). - Smith (2007)) (Note: At one time, scholars tended to use the 'Mother Goddess' label for all female figurines found at sites. This was largely because of the belief that the worship of fertility goddesses was an important part of agricultural societies all over the world, and also due to a tendency to look at ancient remains through the lens of later-day Hinduism, in which goddess worship had an important place. However, scholars are now increasingly aware of the stylistic and technical differences among assemblages of female figurines. Further, all goddesses need not have been part of a single goddess cult, and not all ancient goddesses were necessarily associated with maternity. In the light of such problems, the term 'Mother Goddess' should be replaced by the longer but more neutral phrase— 'female figurines with likely cultic significance.' This does not mean that none of these figurines might have had a religious or cultic significance. It is indeed possible that some were either images that were worshipped or votive offerings that were part of some domestic cult or ritual. However, not all female figurines necessarily had such a function. Whether we are looking at human or animal figurines, in all cases, their possible significance or function has to be assessed, and cannot be assumed. Apart from their form, the context in which they were found is crucial. - Singh (2008) p. 130) Often this is accompanied by a desire for a lost civilization from a bygone era that would have been just, peaceful, and wise. (Note: A popular undercurrent in fringe archaeology concerns the ostensible presence of a lost civilization hidden somewhere in the proverbial dim mists of time. This lost civilization is usually portrayed as having been amazingly and precociously advanced, possessing technological skills as yet still not developed even by our modern civilization and paranormal capacities of which we are not even aware. This lost civilization (or civilizations) is usually presented as the mother culture of all subsequent, historically known civilizations, having passed down their knowledge to them. The lost civilization was, tragically, destroyed, through either a natural cataclysm or some catastrophic technological mishap, and has been somehow hidden from us. - Feder (2010)) However, it is highly unlikely that such a civilization ever existed. (Note: There isn't a scintilla of physical evidence that anything of the kind occurred. There is no archaeological evidence of a supersophisticated civilization 10000 years ago—no gleaming cities, no factories powered by Earth energies... - Feder (2010))

For a long time, feminist authors claimed that these peaceful, matriarchal agrarian societies were exterminated or subjugated by nomadic, patriarchal warrior tribes. An important contribution to this was that of archaeologist Marija Gimbutas. Her work in this field has been questioned. (Note: There is another popular view of figurines, which may be summed up as the “Mother Goddess” issue. The idea of the ascendancy of the Mother Goddess as the primeval deity can be traced back to nineteenth century culture theory, endorsed by Freud and Jung (Parker Pearson 1999:99-100; Talalay 1991), if not before. The modern manifestation was given a huge impetus in the work of Marija Gimbutas (1974, 1989, 1991). To reduce Gimbutas's argument to simplicity, she viewed early Neolithic society as egalitarian, matrifocal, matrilineal, and focused on worshipping a Mother Goddess (Tringham 1993), as evidenced by females figurines found in Neolithic sites in the Near East and eastern Mediterranean region. Few archaeologists support her notion for a number of reasons (Meskell 1995; Tringham 1993, for example). They maintain that the Mother Goddess is an assumption, not a theory, and certainly not a demonstrated thesis. The critics argue that Gimbutas is blending modern myth, feminist ideology, and psychological theory unsupported by clinical research to impose the Mother Goddess archetype on past societies. [...] Gimbutas's own work included excavations at Achilleion (Thessaly). Reviewers of that work (McPherron 1991; Runnels 1990) find problems with the sample size (four 5 x 5 m test units on the slope of a tell), use of dating methods, lack of explanation of field methodology, recording systems or lack thereof, omission of clear criteria for discerning interior versus exterior contexts, typology, statistics---it is hard to find a part of this work not negatively critiqued. - Wesler (2012), pp. 65–66.) Among feminist archaeologists this vision is nowadays also considered highly controversial. (Note: In her book The Faces of the Goddess from 1997, Motz negated the popular theory of the archetypal fertility cult of the Mother Goddess which supposedly would have existed prior to the rise of patriarchy and the oppression of women.) (Note: We begin with an issue that is foundational to the modern study of women in the ancient world, namely the Mother Goddess. As Lauren Talalay demonstrates in Case Study I (“The Mother Goddess in Prehistory: Debates and Perspectives”), there was a desire among scholars, particularly in the 1960s and 1970s, to locate a period in the distant past in which women were not secondary, when female power was celebrated, and when an overarching Mother Goddess was the primary divinity. This myth continues to have great appeal, as witnessed in “goddess-tourism” in the Mediterranean even today. While it is no longer an active scholarly theory, the issue of the Mother Goddess continues to be an exemplar for the problems of studying women in antiquity: mysterious images disembodied from their contexts, multiple scholarly biases and motivations, and conflicting interpretations of the scanty and fragmentary evidence. - James; Dillon (2012))

Since the 1960s, especially in popular culture, the alleged worship of the mother goddess and the social position that women in prehistoric societies supposedly assumed, were linked. This made the debate a political one. According to the goddess movement, the current male-dominated society should return to the egalitarian matriarchy of earlier times. That this form of society ever existed was supposedly supported by many figurines that were found. The Upper Paleolithic Venus figurines have been sometimes explained as depictions of an Earth Goddess similar to Gaia.

In academic circles, this prehistoric matriarchy is considered unlikely. Firstly, worshiping a mother goddess does not necessarily mean that women ruled society. (Note: Worship of a nurturing Mother Goddess who oversees cosmological creation, fertility, and death does not necessarily entail or reflect a pacific matriarchy and female power in society. - Talalay (2012) In addition, the figurines can also portray ordinary women or goddesses, and it is unclear whether there really ever was a mother goddess. (Note: It may be impossible to ever prove one way or the other that a Great Goddess existed in prehistory. As the essays that follow suggest, what is more likely is that interpretations of female deities, their intersection with the roles of women in antiquity, and the place of these debates in modern society will be rewritten many times in the future. - Talalay (2012) (Note: Goddesses of the prime of life are often described as mother goddesses, although that term is questionable, given that the goddesses may not be maternal in any conventional sense. For instance, the single child of Cybele was conceived upon her while she was in the form of a rock and was never reared by her (see Southeastern Europe). Similarly, the eastern Mediterranean goddess Ninlil gave birth by making images of people from clay, as did the Chinese goddess Nüwa. The distinction between mother goddess and creatrix is often difficult to locate. In the Pacific, the goddess Papa both created the earth and gave birth to the gods. The role of goddess as creatrix is common among goddesses, who can create by some other mechanism than birth, as Inuit Aakuluujjusi did when she threw her clothing on the ground, which walked away as animals. - Monaghan (2014))

== List of mother goddesses ==
=== Africa ===
==== Bakongo ====
- Mamba Muntu
- Nzambici

==== Egyptian ====
- Hathor
- Isis
- Mut
- Nut

==== Guanche ====
- Chaxiraxi

==== West Africa ====
- Asase Yaa (Akan)
- Mami Wata (Regional)
- Nana Buluku (Dahomey)
- Yemòó (Yoruba)
- Yemọja (Yoruba)

=== East and Central Asia ===
==== Chinese ====
- Lishan Laomu
- Doumu
- Guanyin
- Mazu
- Nüwa
- Queen Mother of the West

==== Myanmar (Burma) ====
- Popa Medaw
- Ma Ngwe Taung
- Medaw Shwezaga

==== Japanese ====
- Izanami
- Amaterasu

==== Korean ====
- Samsin Halmeoni

==== Turkic ====
- Umay

=== West Asia ===
==== Anatolian ====
- Anahit (Armenian)
- Anahita (Iranian)
- Cybele (Phrygian)
- Ḫannaḫanna (Hittite)
- Leto (Lycian)
- Nane (Armenian)

==== Mesopotamian ====
- Asherah
- Bau
- Gatumdug
- Kishar
- Lisin
- Ninhursag
- Nunbarsegunu

==== Semitic ====
- Al-Lat (Arabian)
- Asherah (Canaanite)
- Tanit (Punic)

=== South Asia ===
==== Buddhism ====
- Prajñāpāramitā Devī

==== Hinduism ====
- Durga
- Bhagavati
- Kali
- Kamakhya
- Karumariamman
- Khodiyar
- Tripura Sundari (also known as Rajarajeshwari)
- Lakshmi
- Mariamman
- Maisamma
- Matrikas
- Parvati
- Radha
- Rukmini
- Saraswathi
- Shakti
- Sita

==== Jainism ====
- Ambika

==== Meitei ====
- Leimarel Sidabi
- Loktak Ima
- Yumjao Leima

=== Southeast Asia ===
==== Vietnamese ====
- Mẫu Thượng Thiên
- Mẫu Thượng Ngàn
- Mẫu Thoải
- Mẫu Địa
- Thiên Y A Na

==== Sundanese ====
- Sunan Ambu

=== Europe ===
==== Albanian ====
- Dheu
- Nëna e Diellit

==== Baltic ====
- Mahte

==== Celtic ====
- Aveta (Gallo-Roman)
- Danu (Irish)
- Dea Matrona (Gaulish)
- Dôn (Welsh)
- Ernmas (Irish)
- Mór Muman (Irish)

==== Finnic ====
- Maaemä (Finnish and Estonian)

==== Germanic ====
- Frigg

==== Greek ====
- Demeter
- Gaia
- Rhea

==== Roman ====
- Ceres
- Terra

==== Slavic ====
- Mat Zemlya
- Mokosh
- Živa

=== Oceania ===
==== Australian Aboriginal ====
- Eingana
- Kunapipi

==== Polynesian ====
- Atua-anua (Rapa Nui)
- Ika-Roa (Maori)
- Varima-te-takere (Cook Islands)

=== Americas ===
==== Aztec ====
- Coatlicue
- Cihuacōātl
- Toci

==== Chamacoco ====
- Eschetewuarha

==== Inca ====
- Mama Killa
- Mama Ocllo
- Pachamama

==== Muisca ====
- Bachué

==== Taíno ====
- Atabey

=== Modern Religions ===
==== Mormonism ====
- Heavenly Mother

==== Thelema ====
- Babalon
- Nuit

==== Neopaganism ====
- Triple Goddess

== See also ==
- List of fertility deities
- Shekhinah – In Jewish theology, the dwelling or settling of the divine presence of God
- Worship of heavenly bodies – Worship of stars and other heavenly bodies as deities

== Bibliography ==
- Balter, Michael (2006). The Goddess and the Bull: Çatalhöyük – An Archaeological Journey to the Dawn of Civilization. Free Press. ISBN 978-0-7432-4360-5. OCLC 883184058.
- Bickmore, Barry R., "Mormonism in the Early Jewish Christian Milieu", Mormonism in the Early Jewish Christian Milieu (1999).
- Derr, Jill Mulvay, "The Significance of 'O My Father' in the Personal Journey of Eliza R. Snow", BYU Studies 36, no. 1 (1996–97): 84–126.
- Feder, K.L. (2010): Encyclopedia of Dubious Archaeology. From Atlantis to the Walam Olum, Greenwood
- Gimbutas, M. (1989): The Language of the Goddess, Thames & Hudson
- Gimbutas, M. (1991): The Civilization of the Goddess
- Hinckley, Gordon B., "Daughters of God", Ensign, November 1991: 97–100.
- Hodder, I. (2010): Religion in the Emergence of Civilization. Çatalhöyük as a Case Study, Cambridge University Press
- James, S.L.; Dillon, S. (ed.), (2012): A Companion to Women in the Ancient World, Wiley-Blackwell
- Jorgensen, Danny L., "The Mormon Gender-Inclusive Image of God", Journal of Mormon History, 27, No. 1 (Spring 2000): 95–126.
- Joseph's Speckled Bird, Letter to the Editor, Times and Seasons 6: 892 (1 May 1845).
- Mellaart, J., (1967): Catal Huyuk. A Neolithic Town in Anatolia, McGraw-Hill
- Monaghan, P. (2014): Encyclopedia of Goddesses and Heroines, New World Library
- Motz, L. (1997): The Faces of the Goddess, Oxford University Press
- Origen, Origen's Commentary on the Gospel of John: Book II, ¶6. Included in The Ante-Nicene Fathers, 10 vols. (Buffalo: The Christian Literature Publishing Company, 1885–1896) 10:329–330.
- Pearson, Carol Lynn, "Mother Wove the Morning: a one-woman play" (October 1992) (ISBN 1-56236-307-7) (depicting, according to the video's description, Eliza R. Snow as one of "sixteen women [who] throughout history search for God the Mother and invite her back into the human family").
- Pratt, Orson, Journal of Discourses 18:292 (12 November 1876).
- Singh, U. (2008): A History of Ancient and Early Medieval India. From the Stone Age to the 12th Century, Pearson Education India
- Smith, Joseph F. et al., "The Origin of Man", Improvement Era (November 1909): 80.
- Smith, Joseph, King Follett Discourse, 7 April 1844, published in Times and Seasons 5 (15 August 1844): 612–17, and reprinted in the History of The Church of Jesus Christ of Latter-day Saints, edited by B. H. Roberts, 2d ed. rev. (Salt Lake City: Deseret Book, (1976–1980), 6:302–17; see also "The Christian Godhead—Plurality of Gods", History of the Church, 6: 473–79.
- Smith, A.C. (2007): Powerful Mysteries. Myth and Politics in Virginia Woolf, ProQuest
- Wesler, K.W. (2012): An Archaeology of Religion, University Press of America
- Wilcox, Linda P., "The Mormon Concept of a Mother in Heaven", Sisters in Spirit: Mormon Women in Historical and Cultural Perspective, edited by Maureen Ursenbach Beecher and Lavina Fielding Anderson (Urbana: University of Illinois Press, 1987), 64–77. Also Wilcox, Linda P., "The Mormon Concept of a Mother in Heaven", Women and Authority: Re-emerging Mormon Feminism, edited by Maxine Hanks (Salt Lake: Signature Books, 1992), 3–18 Women and Authority – 01 |
- Woodruff, Wilford, Journal of Discourses 18:31–32 (27 June 1875).
