= Imidazole N-acetyltransferase =

Identifiers
- EC no.: 2.3.1.2
- CAS no.: 9029-89-4

Databases
- IntEnz: IntEnz view
- BRENDA: BRENDA entry
- ExPASy: NiceZyme view
- KEGG: KEGG entry
- MetaCyc: metabolic pathway
- PRIAM: profile
- PDB structures: RCSB PDB PDBe PDBsum
- Gene Ontology: AmiGO / QuickGO
Search
- PMC: articles
- PubMed: articles
- NCBI: proteins

Imidazole N-acetyltransferase (EC 2.3.1.2) is an enzyme that catalyzes the chemical reaction

imidazole
+
acetyl-CoA
N-acetylimidazole
+ coenzyme A

The two substrates of this enzyme are imidazole and acetyl-CoA. Its products are N-acetylimidazole and coenzyme A. It was characterised from Clostridium kluyveri.

This enzyme belongs to the family of transferases, specifically those acyltransferases transferring groups other than aminoacyl groups. The systematic name of this enzyme class is acetyl-CoA:imidazole N-acetyltransferase. Other names in common use include imidazole acetylase, and imidazole acetyltransferase.
