= Bickmore =

Bickmore is a surname. Notable people with the surname include:

- Albert S. Bickmore (1839–1914), American naturalist, a founder of the American Museum of Natural History
- Arthur Ernest Bickmore (1886–1956), Baptist minister in Queensland, Australia
- Barry R. Bickmore, professor of geological sciences at Brigham Young University
- Carrie Bickmore (born 1980), Australian radio news presenter and television presenter
- Eric Bickmore (1899–1979), English schoolteacher and cricketer
- Lee Bickmore (1908–1986), American CEO of Nabisco
- Wendy Bickmore (born 1961), British genome biologist at the University of Edinburgh
- Edward Bickmore Ellison Taylor or Ted Taylor (1906–1982), New Zealand lawyer, politician and diplomat

== See also ==
- Bickmore, West Virginia, unincorporated community in Clay County, West Virginia, United States
- BiCMOS
- Bickmorites
- Bicknor, village in Kent
