= Photosynthesis (disambiguation) =

Photosynthesis is a biological process to convert light into chemical energy.

Photosynthesis may also refer to:

- Photosynthesis (board game), first introduced by French publisher Blue Orange in 2017
- Photosynthesis, a song on the 2012 album Blank Banshee 0 by the Canadian artist Blank Banshee
- Photosynthesis, a song on the 2008 album Love Ire & Song by the English singer-songwriter Frank Turner

== See also ==
- Photosynthesis Research
