= Lee Penn =

American chemist and academic

R. Lee Penn
- Education: Beloit College; University of Wisconsin–Madison
- Scientific career
- Workplaces: University of Minnesota; Johns Hopkins University; Towson University
- Thesis: Growth and phase transformations : Insights from hydrothermal coarsening experiments using nanocrystalline TiO₂ (1998)

R. Lee Penn is an American chemist and the Merck Professor of Chemistry at the University of Minnesota. Their research considers crystal growth, materials and environmental chemistry. Penn is a Fellow of the American Chemical Society. In 2020 Penn was awarded the University of Minnesota George W. Taylor Award for Distinguished Service.

== Early life and education ==
Penn earned their undergraduate degree at Beloit College. They moved to the University of Wisconsin–Madison for their graduate studies, studying the growth and phase transformations of titanium dioxide. Penn moved to the Johns Hopkins University as a postdoctoral fellow.

== Research and career ==
Penn started their independent career at the University of Minnesota in 2001. In 2008 they were awarded a McKnight Presidential Fellowship at the University of Minnesota. Penn studies the growth mechanisms of crystals and nanomaterials. Amongst such systems, Penn is interested in the self-assembly of metal oxide nanoparticles and their emergent phenomena. They are particularly interested in advanced imaging techniques, including scanning electron microscopy.

== Academic service ==
Penn has been an active member of the American Chemical Society since 2011. They have served as chair of the American Chemical Society Division of Geochemistry. Penn is a founding member of their department's Diversity and Inclusion Committee. Penn is also committed to outreach, education and public engagement. They established a microscopy camp to introduce middle- and high school students in exploring microscopy and advanced materials characterisation techniques.

== Awards and honors ==
- 2009 George W. Taylor College of Science and Engineering Alumni Society Award for Distinguished Teaching
- 2015 Horace T. Morse-University of Minnesota Alumni Association Award for Outstanding Contributions to Undergraduate Education
- 2015 Elected Fellow of the American Chemical Society
- 2016 University of Minnesota Women's Centre Charlotte Striebel Equity Award
- 2020 University of Minnesota George W. Taylor Award for Distinguished Service

== Selected publications ==
- Penn RL; Jillian Banfield (14 August 1998). "Imperfect Oriented Attachment: Dislocation Generation in Defect-Free Nanocrystals". Science. 281 (5379): 969–971. doi:10.1126/science.281.5379.969. ISSN 0036-8075. PMID 9703506. Wikidata Q56529551.
- J F Banfield; S A Welch; H Zhang; T T Ebert; R L Penn (1 August 2000). "Aggregation-based crystal growth and microstructure development in natural iron oxyhydroxide biomineralization products". Science. 289 (5480): 751–754. Bibcode:2000Sci...289..751B. doi:10.1126/science.289.5480.751. ISSN 0036-8075. PMID 10926531. Wikidata Q29012738.
- Michael F Hochella; Steven K Lower; Patricia A Maurice; R Lee Penn; Nita Sahai; Donald L Sparks; Benjamin S Twining (1 March 2008). "Nanominerals, mineral nanoparticles, and Earth systems". Science. 319 (5870): 1631–1635. doi:10.1126/science.1141134. ISSN 0036-8075. PMID 18356515. Wikidata Q37115255.

== Personal life ==
Penn is non-binary and uses they/them pronouns. Penn also enjoys riding and racing bicycles, hauling all sorts of things by bicycle (including humans, furniture, and groceries), advocating for non-car based transportation, volunteering with Sisters Camelot to distribute food that would otherwise be discarded, advocating for folks who hold marginalized identities, working to remove barriers for folks who hold marginalized identities, parenting their fantastic teen (born in 2002), being a loving spouse, and 3D printing. Penn faced cancer treatment in 2011–2012.
