= Roger Stanier =

Canadian microbiologist (1916–1982)

Roger Yate Stanier
- Born: October 22, 1916; Victoria, British Columbia, Canada
- Died: January 29, 1982 (aged 65); Paris, France
- Education: Victoria College; University of British Columbia; University of California, Los Angeles; Stanford University
- Known for: Cyanobacteria
- Awards: Eli Lilly and Company-Elanco Research Award (1950); Carlos J. Finlay Prize for Microbiology (1980); Leeuwenhoek Medal (1981)
- Scientific career
- Fields: Microbiology
- Workplaces: University of California, Berkeley; Institut Pasteur
- Doctoral advisor: C. B. van Niel

Roger Yate Stanier (22 October 1916 – 29 January 1982) was a Canadian microbiologist who was influential in the development of modern microbiology. As a member of the Delft School and former student of C. B. van Niel, he made important contributions to the taxonomy of bacteria, including the classification of blue-green algae as cyanobacteria. In 1957, he and co-authors wrote The Microbial World, an influential microbiology textbook which was published in five editions over three decades. In the course of 24 years at the University of California, Berkeley he reached the rank of professor and served as chair of the Department of Bacteriology before leaving for the Pasteur Institute in 1971. He received several awards over the course of his career, including the Leeuwenhoek Medal. He was a Fellow of the Royal Society and a Foreign Associate of the National Academy of Sciences and the Légion d’Honneur.

== Early life ==
Roger Yate Stanier was born to British immigrant parents on 22 October 1916 in Victoria, British Columbia, Canada. His father studied medicine at the University of Toronto and later established a private practice in diagnostic radiology. His mother, a teacher, studied English literature at the University of Cambridge.

His early education was at private boarding schools. Beginning at age 7 he attended St. Christopher's School in Victoria, British Columbia for two years, followed by what Stanier described as "five long and hellish years" at Shawnigan Lake School. His father removed him from Shawnigan after he contracted pneumonia, upon his recovery he attended Oak Bay High School until his graduation in 1931 at the age of 15. He then enrolled at the local junior college, Victoria College, where he studied biology, literature, and history. He subsequently transferred to the University of British Columbia (UBC) with the intention to study literature and history. His parents demurred, however, so he settled on bacteriology in order to placate his physician father, ultimately graduating with first-class Honours in bacteriology in 1936.

Because he felt he had had insufficient exposure to the physical sciences at UBC, he then went to the Ludwig-Maximilians-Universität München to study chemistry. The rise of Nazism had poisoned the environment at the university, so he cut short his studies there and decided to attend graduate school in the United States.

== Graduate work (1937–1947) ==
On account of the presence of his friend, Mike Lerner, he chose to enroll in the Department of Bacteriology of the University of California, Berkeley, but he found himself uninterested by the phage research done under A.P. Krueger, and he subsequently accepted a teaching assistantship at the University of California Los Angeles (UCLA) for the 1938–1939 term, his first paid employment. During his time at UCLA, he attended the a course taught by C. B. van Niel at the Hopkins Marine Station in Pacific Grove, California. His experience there encouraged him to pursue general microbiology. After receiving his M.A. from UCLA in 1939 he returned to Pacific Grove as van Niel's student.

After his graduation he worked with Marjory Stephenson at the University of Cambridge as a Guggenheim fellow beginning in 1945.

== University of California, Berkeley (1947–1971) ==
Upon his return to the United States he served a short appointment at the University of Indiana.

In 1946-1947 we had at Indiana Roger Stanier, a marvelous teacher of bacterial biochemistry, a superb lecturer, and an arrogant uncompromising intellectual. Roger was from British Columbia, but English in spirit, an though vocally anti-puritan, emotionally a knot of puritan revolts and inhibitions — a delightfully neurotic man. As in Dante’s Inferno Farinata was contemptuous of Hell, so did Roger hold all of Indiana in contempt. From him I began to learn that biochemistry was not just chemistry, but biology. I learned about the power of an integrated view of metabolism and of the subtle interplay between organisms and their environment. Most important, I learned that bacteriology could be as much fun as genetics, if of a different kind of fun.

In 1947 he accepted an invitation to join the Department of Bacteriology of the University of California, Berkeley, where he remained for most of his career.

== Institut Pasteur ==
In 1971 he left Berkeley and moved to Paris, where he worked at the Institut Pasteur for the last decade of his life. He described the reasons for his departure as both academic and political: academic disruptions amid the campus turmoil associated with the Free Speech Movement, then governor Ronald Reagan's ouster of University of California president Clark Kerr, and the election of President Richard Nixon. Along with his wife Germaine Cohen-Bazire, he accepted the invitation of Élie Wollman to take over the former lab space of François Jacob and Jacques Monod, with the stipulation that he be allowed to work on cyanobacteria exclusively. He was elected a Fellow of the Royal Society in 1978.

== Scientific legacy ==
Stanier's research career included a diverse variety of research problems bound by a desire to synthesize the general and specific patterns observed in bacteria into a more unified understanding of biology as a whole. Together with C. B. van Niel, Stanier was described by Carl Woese as one of the "only consistently insightful and articulate reporters of the early search for a microbial phylogeny". Stanier participated in Bergey's Manual Trust during its conception. He invented the technique of simultaneous adaption for the analysis of metabolic pathways.

Stanier's work on Cyanobacteria focused on obligate autotrophy, fatty acid composition, structure of phycobiliproteins and phycobilisomes, chromatic adaptation, nitrogen fixation, and their nutrition and taxonomy. He led the proposal to include cyanobacteria, which he called blue-green algae or cyanophytes, within the bacteria rather than consider the cyanobacteria as distinct from bacteria.

Stanier also authored an influential textbook, The Microbial World. The Microbial World played an important role in the promulgation of the concepts of "prokaryote" and "eukaryote" as negative definitions of Bacteria and Archea.

== Bibliography ==
- Stanier, R. Y. (1980). "The Journey, not the Arrival, Matters". Annual Review of Microbiology. 34: 1–48. doi:10.1146/annurev.mi.34.100180.000245. PMID 6776882.
- Stanier, R. Y.; Niel, C. B. (1962). "The concept of a bacterium". Archiv für Mikrobiologie. 42: 17–35. doi:10.1007/BF00425185. PMID 13916221. S2CID 29859498.
- Stanier, Roger Y. (1986). The Microbial world. Englewood Cliffs, N.J.: Prentice-Hall. ISBN 0-13-581042-6.
- Schachman, H. K.; Pardee, A. B.; Stanier, R. Y. (1952). "Studies on the macro-molecular organization of microbial cells". Archives of Biochemistry and Biophysics. 38: 245–260. doi:10.1016/0003-9861(52)90029-5. PMID 12997099.
- Stanier, R. Y. (1953). "Adaptation, evolutionary and physiological: or Darwinism among the micro-organisms". Adaptation in micro-organisms. Third Symp. Soc. Gen. Microbiol., London: Cambridge.
- Stanier, R. Y. (1977). "The position of cyanobacteria in the world of phototrophs". Carlsberg Research Communications. 42 (2): 77–98. doi:10.1007/BF02906487.
