= Leeuwenhoek Medal =

Dutch science award

The Leeuwenhoek Medal, established in 1875 by the Royal Netherlands Academy of Arts and Sciences (KNAW), in honor of the 17th- and 18th-century microscopist Antoni van Leeuwenhoek, is granted every ten years to the scientist judged to have made the most significant contribution to microbiology during the preceding decade. Starting in 2015, the Royal Dutch Society for Microbiology (KNVM) began awarding the Leeuwenhoek Medal, selecting Jillian Banfield, the first woman to receive the award in 2023.

== Recipients ==
The following persons have received the Leeuwenhoek medal:

- 1877 Christian Gottfried Ehrenberg, Germany
- 1885 Ferdinand Cohn, Germany
- 1895 Louis Pasteur, France
- 1905 Martinus Beijerinck, Netherlands
- 1915 Sir David Bruce, United Kingdom
- 1925 Félix d'Herelle, (at the time) Egypt
- 1935 Sergei Nikolaevitch Winogradsky, France
- 1950 Selman Abraham Waksman, United States
- 1960 André Lwoff, France
- 1970 Cornelius Bernardus van Niel (Kees van Niel), United States
- 1981 Roger Yate Stanier, France
- 1992 Carl Woese, United States
- 2003 Karl Stetter, Germany
- 2015 Craig Venter, United States of America
- 2023 Jillian Banfield, Australia

== See also ==
- Royal Society Leeuwenhoek Lecture
- List of biology awards
