= Sergei Winogradsky =

Ukrainian and Russian microbiologist (1856–1953)

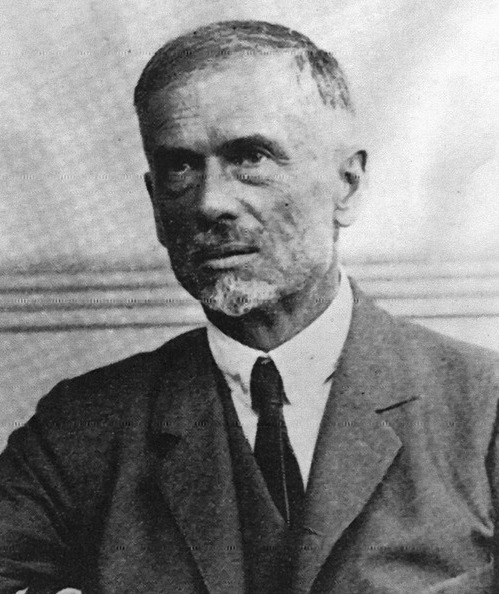
- Born: 13 September 1856; Kiev, Kiev Governorate, Russian Empire
- Died: 24 February 1953 (aged 96); Brie-Comte-Robert, France
- Education: Saint Petersburg Imperial University
- Known for: Nitrogen cycle Chemoautotrophy; Sulfur-oxidizing bacteria
- Awards: Leeuwenhoek Medal (1935)
- Scientific career
- Fields: Microbiology
- Workplaces: Saint Petersburg Imperial University; University of Straßburg; Institute of Experimental Medicine; Pasteur Institute

Sergei Nikolaevich Winogradsky ForMemRS (Russian: Сергей Николаевич Виноградский; Ukrainian: Сергій Миколайович Виноградський; 13 September [O.S. 1 September] 1856 – 24 February 1953), also published under the name Sergius Winogradsky, was a Ukrainian and Russian microbiologist, ecologist and soil scientist who pioneered the cycle-of-life concept. Winogradsky discovered the first known form of lithotrophy during his research with Beggiatoa in 1887. He reported that Beggiatoa oxidized hydrogen sulfide (H_{2}S) as an energy source and formed intracellular sulfur droplets. This research provided the first example of lithotrophy, but not autotrophy. Born in the capital of present-day Ukraine, his legacy is also celebrated by this nation.

His research on nitrifying bacteria would report the first known form of chemoautotrophy, showing how a lithotroph fixes carbon dioxide (CO_{2}) to make organic compounds.

He is best known in school science as the inventor of the Winogradsky column technique for the study of sediment microbes.

== Biography ==
Winogradsky was born in Kiev, Russian Empire to a family of wealthy lawyers. Among his paternal ancestors were Cossack atamans, and on the maternal side he was linked to the Skoropadsky family. In his youth Winogradsky was "strictly devoted to the Orthodox faith", though he later became irreligious.

After graduating from the 2nd Kiev Gymnasium in 1873, he began studying law, but he entered the Imperial Conservatoire of Music in Saint Petersburg in 1875 to study piano. However, after two years of music training, he entered the Saint Petersburg Imperial University in 1877 to study chemistry under Nikolai Menshutkin and botany under Andrei Famintsyn, receiving his degree in 1881 and staying on for a master's in botany, which he received in 1884. In 1885, he moved to the University of Straßburg to work under the renowned botanist Anton de Bary, subsequently becoming renowned for his work on sulfur bacteria.

In 1888, after de Bary's death, he relocated to Zürich, where he began investigation into the process of nitrification, identifying the genera Nitrosomonas and Nitrosococcus, which oxidizes ammonium to nitrite, and Nitrobacter, which oxidizes nitrite to nitrate.

He returned to St. Petersburg for the period 1891–1905, obtaining his doctoral degree in 1902 and from then on heading the division of general microbiology of the Institute of Experimental Medicine. During this period, he identified the obligate anaerobe Clostridium pasteurianum, which is capable of fixing atmospheric nitrogen. In St. Petersburg he trained Vasily Omelianski, who popularized Winogradsky's concepts and methodology in the Soviet Union during the next decades.

In 1901, he was elected an honorary member of the Moscow Society of Naturalists and, in 1902, a corresponding member of the French Academy of Sciences. In 1905, due to ill health, the scientist left the institute and moved from St. Petersburg to the town of Gorodok in Podolia, where from 1892 he owned a huge estate. In fact, while working as the director of the Institute of Experimental Medicine, Winogradsky renounced his salary, which was transferred to a special account, and then used these funds to build a room for a scientific library, the director of which lived on the income from the estate, where agricultural work was carried out.

In Gorodok Winogradsky addressed the problems of agriculture and soil science. He introduced new management methods, bought the best varieties of seeds, plants, and livestock, and advanced technology. His estate became one of the richest and most successful in Podolia, and remained profitable even during the First World War, falling under Austro-Hungarian occupation.

He retired from active scientific work in 1905, dividing his time between his private estate in Gorodok and Switzerland. After the revolution of 1917, Winogradsky went first to Switzerland and then to Belgrade. In 1922, he accepted an invitation to head the Pasteur Institute's division of agricultural bacteriology at an experimental station at Brie-Comte-Robert, France, about 30 km from Paris. During this period, he worked on a number of topics, among them iron bacteria, nitrifying bacteria, nitrogen fixation by Azotobacter, cellulose-decomposing bacteria, and culture methods for soil microorganisms. In 1923 Winogradsky became an honorary member of the Russian Academy of Sciences despite his emigration. He retired from active life in 1940 and died in Brie-Comte-Robert in 1953.

== Discoveries ==
Winogradsky discovered various biogeochemical cycles and parts of these cycles. These discoveries include

- His work on bacterial sulfide oxidation for which he first became renowned, including the first known form of lithotrophy (in Beggiatoa).
- His work on the Nitrogen cycle including
  - The identification of the obligate anaerobe Clostridium pasteurianum is a free living microbe capable of fixing atmospheric nitrogen and not living in legume root nodules.
  - Chemosynthesis – his most noted discovery
  - The Winogradsky column

Nitrogen cycle

=== Chemosynthesis ===
Winogradsky is best known for discovering chemoautotrophy, which soon became popularly known as chemosynthesis, the process by which organisms derive energy from a number of different inorganic compounds and obtain carbon in the form of carbon dioxide. Previously, it was believed that autotrophs obtained their energy solely from light, not from reactions of inorganic compounds. With the discovery of organisms that oxidized inorganic compounds such as hydrogen sulfide and ammonium as energy sources, autotrophs could be divided into two groups: photoautotrophs and chemoautotrophs. Winogradsky was one of the first researchers to attempt to understand microorganisms outside of the medical context, making him among the first students of microbial ecology and environmental microbiology.

The Winogradsky column remains an important display of chemoautotrophy and microbial ecology, demonstrated in microbiology lectures around the world.

== Memorials ==
- The Institute of Microbiology of the Russian Academy of Sciences bears Winogradsky's name since 2003.
- In 2012, a bust of the scientist was unveiled on the grounds of his former estate in Horodok, Khmelnytskyi Oblast, Ukraine.
- In Ukraine, the study and popularization of the life and activities of Sergey Winogradsky are promoted by the Winogradsky Club, whose centre is located in the Horodok Museum of Local History (G-MUSEUM). One of the museum's exhibitions is a reconstruction of Winogradsky's laboratory in Brie-Comte-Robert including a wax figure of the scientist.
Representations of Winogradsky in Horodok
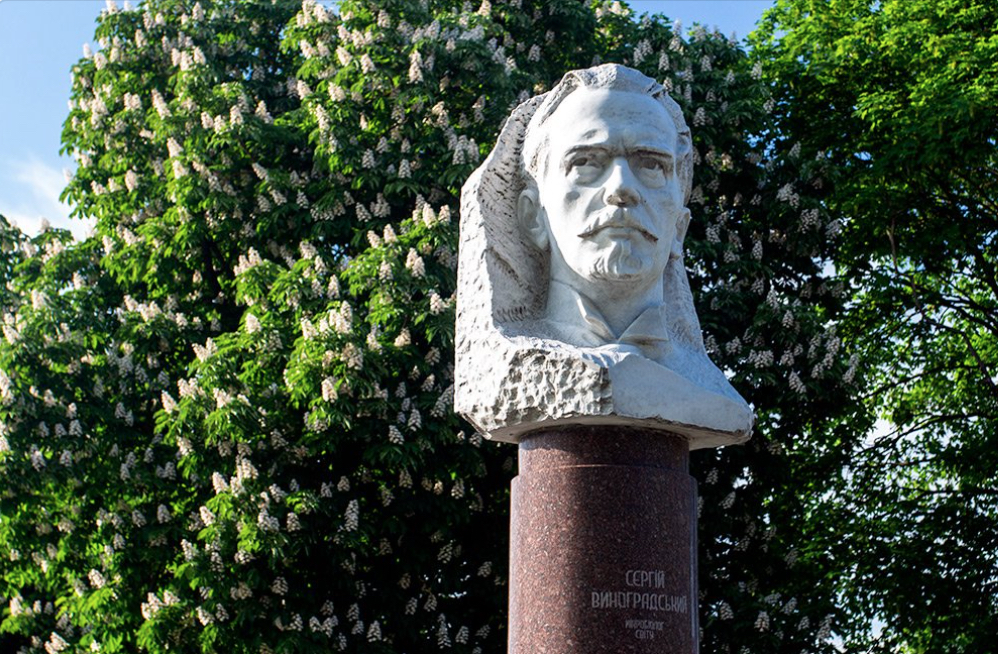
Bust of Winogradsky

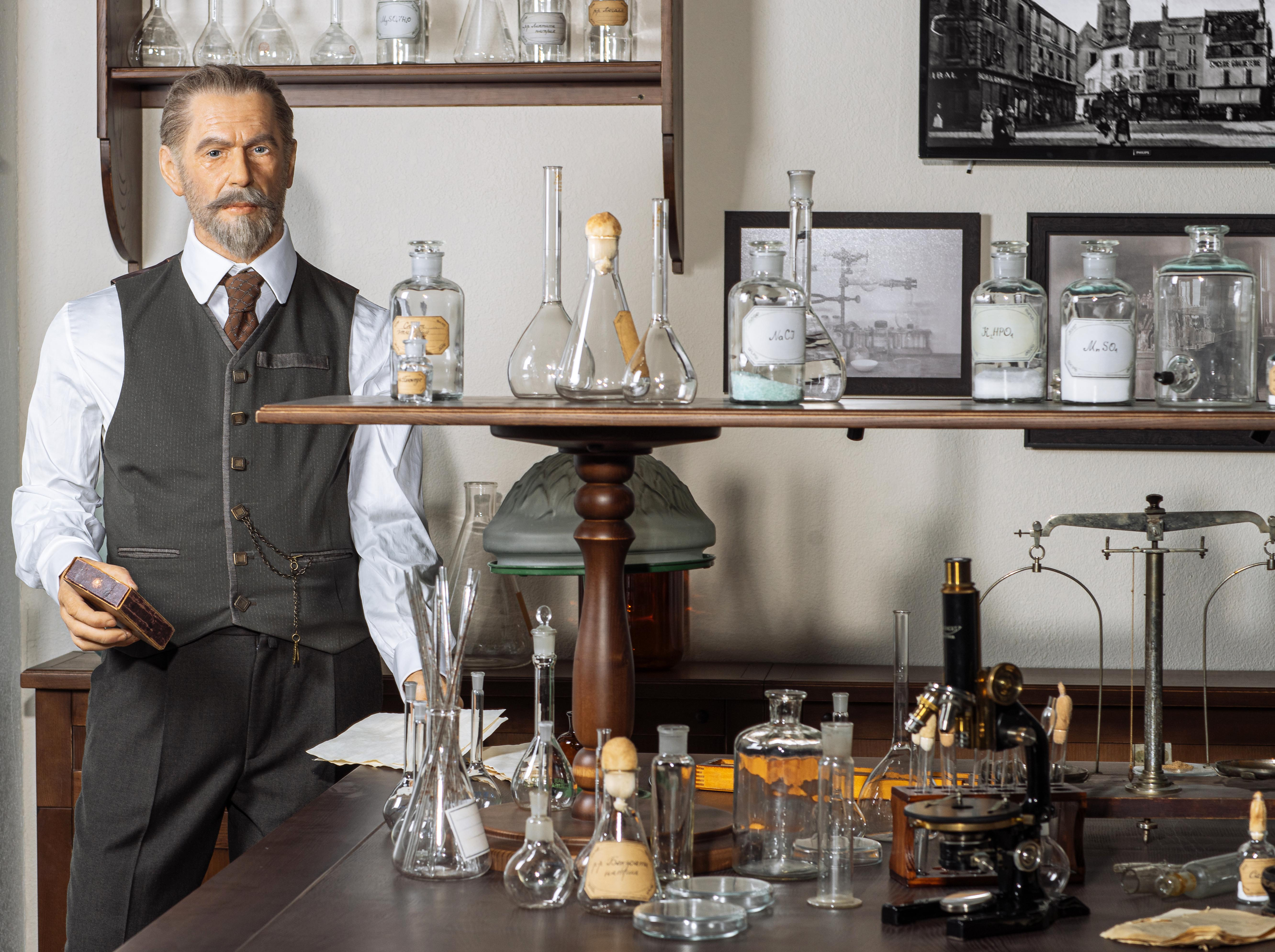
Recreation of Winogradsky's laboratory at the G-MUSEUM

== See also ==
- Hermann Hellriegel
- Martinus Beijerinck
