= Gloeobacterales =

Scientific classification
- Domain: Bacteria
- Kingdom: Bacillati
- Phylum: Cyanobacteriota
- Class: Cyanophyceae
- Order: Gloeobacterales; Cavalier-Smith

Families and genera
- Anthocerotibacteraceae; Anthocerotibacter; "Candidatus Cyanoaurora"; "Gloeobacteraceae"; Gloeobacter

Gloeobacterales is an order of cyanobacteria. Two of its members, Gloeobacter and Anthocerotibacter, diverged 1.4 billion years ago. Members of this order differ from other cyanobacteria in that they have no thylakoids, yet like other cyanobacteria (and hence unlike other photosynthetic bacteria) they possess both photosystem I and photosystem II: they put the photosystems on the cytoplasmic membrane. Understanding how photosynthesis works in this order should shed light on the evolution of oxygen-producing photosynthesis.
