= Germaine Cohen-Bazire =

French microbiologist (1920-2001)

- Born: Germaine Bazire; 2 September 1920; Thonon-les-Bains, France
- Died: 9 May 2001 (aged 80); Vancouver, Canada
- Occupation: Microbiologist
- Spouse: Roger Stanier
- Children: 2
- Awards: Guggenheim Fellowship (1960)

Academic background
- Education: University of Toulouse

Academic work
- Discipline: Microbiology
- Institutions: Pasteur Institute

Germaine Cohen-Bazire Stanier (2 September 1920 – 9 May 2001) was a French microbiologist. A 1960 Guggenheim Fellow, she studied the role of proteins and other chemicals in the biological processes of bacteria. She worked as a researcher at the University of California, Berkeley and Pasteur Institute, the latter of where she chaired the Unité de Physiologie Microbienne.

== Biography ==
Germaine Bazire was born on 2 September 1920 in Thonon-les-Bains. Her mother taught at a primary school and her father taught science at a secondary school. She obtained a baccalauréat at a Toulouse lycée in 1938 and moved onto the University of Toulouse, a licence ès sciences in 1942 and diplôme d'études supérieures in 1945.

She joined the French National Centre for Scientific Research in 1945, serving as a research chief from 1955 to 1957. During this period, she obtained her ScD from the University of Paris in 1950, with her thesis involving her research on butyric and acetonobutylic fermentation, supervised by Georges Cohen. She also worked at Jacques Monod's laboratory at the Pasteur Institute. In 1953, she moved to the University of California, Berkeley as a postdoctoral fellow, starting as a junior research bacteriologist before becoming a research bacteriologist in 1956.

During her early career at the Pasteur Institute, she researched enzyme induction and in 1953, helped discover what represses the ability of tryptophan to produce tryptophan synthase. She started researching alphaproteobacteria and cyanobacteria while working at UCB, including athiorhodaceae and chloroniums, and she once studied the role of phycobiliproteins in cyanobacteria. She also isolated a mutated strain of cereibacter sphaeroides to further advance research on carotenoids.

She appeared at the 1959 Oregon State University Biology Colloquium along with several nationally-known biologists. In 1960, she was awarded a Guggenheim Fellowship to study the "regulation of the synthesis of structural units in bacterial cells". Photosynthesis Research called her a "world leader in the ultrastructure and physiology of cyanobacteria", while a trio of Pasteur Institute colleagues – Agnes Ullmann, Georges N. Cohen, and François Jacob – renarked that she was "internationally recognized as one of the specialists on photosynthetic prokaryotes".

Returning from the United States, she rejoined the Pasteur Institute in 1971. She was appointed head of the Unité de Physiologie Microbienne in 1982 and professor at the Pasteur Institute in 1985, before she retired from the institution in 1988. She served as the treasurer of the International Cell Research Organization.

Her second marriage was to Roger Stanier, a Canadian microbiologist with whom she worked at the Pasteur Institute. They had one daughter, as well as a son from a previous marriage. She cited André Michel Lwoff and Jacques Monod, both Nobel laureates, as her "guardian angel" and "master of thinking" respectively. She died on 9 May 2001 in Vancouver, where she had retired in the last eight years; she was 80.
