= Jillian Banfield =

Australian scientist

Jillian Banfield FRS FAA
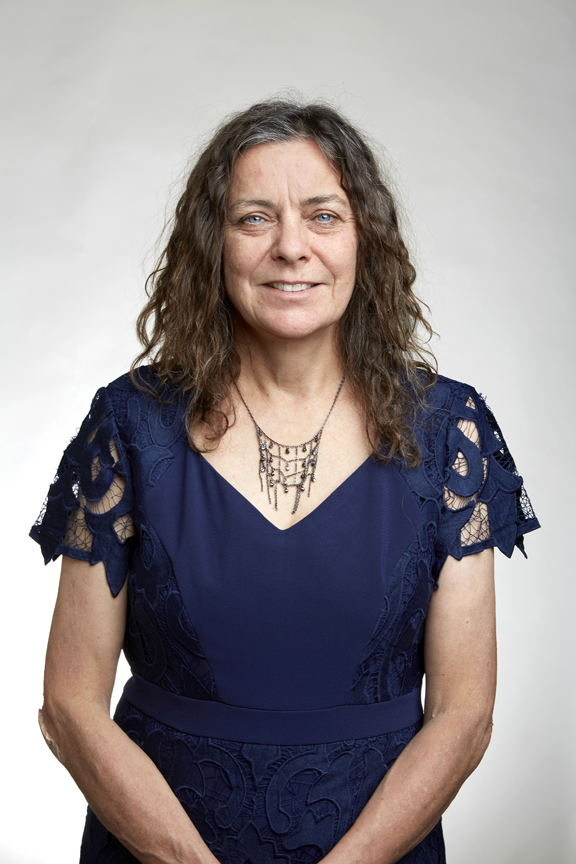
- Banfield at the Royal Society admissions day in July 2018
- Born: 18 August 1959 (age 67); Armidale, New South Wales, Australia
- Education: Australian National University (MA); Johns Hopkins University (PhD)
- Spouse: Peregrine Smith
- Awards: Leeuwenhoek Medal (2023); Fellow of the Royal Society (2018); V. M. Goldschmidt Award (2017); American Society for Microbiology Fellow (2015); Australian Academy of Science (2015); Dana Medal (2010)
- Scientific career
- Fields: Nanogeoscience; Microbial Ecology; Geomicrobiology; Metagenomics; Mineralogy
- Workplaces: University of Melbourne; University of Wisconsin–Madison; University of Tokyo; University of California, Berkeley
- Thesis: HRTEM studies of subsolidus alteration, weathering, and subsequent diagenetic and low-grade metamorphic reactions (1990)
- Doctoral advisor: David R. Veblen
- Website: nanogeoscience.berkeley.edu

Jillian Fiona Banfield FRS FAA (born 18 August 1959) is professor at the University of California, Berkeley with appointments in the Earth Science, Ecosystem Science and Materials Science and Engineering departments. She is the director of microbiology at the Innovative Genomics Institute, is affiliated with Lawrence Berkeley National Laboratory and has a position at the University of Melbourne, Australia. Some of her most noted work includes publications on the structure and functioning of microbial communities and the nature, properties and reactivity (especially crystal growth) of nanomaterials.

== Early life and education ==
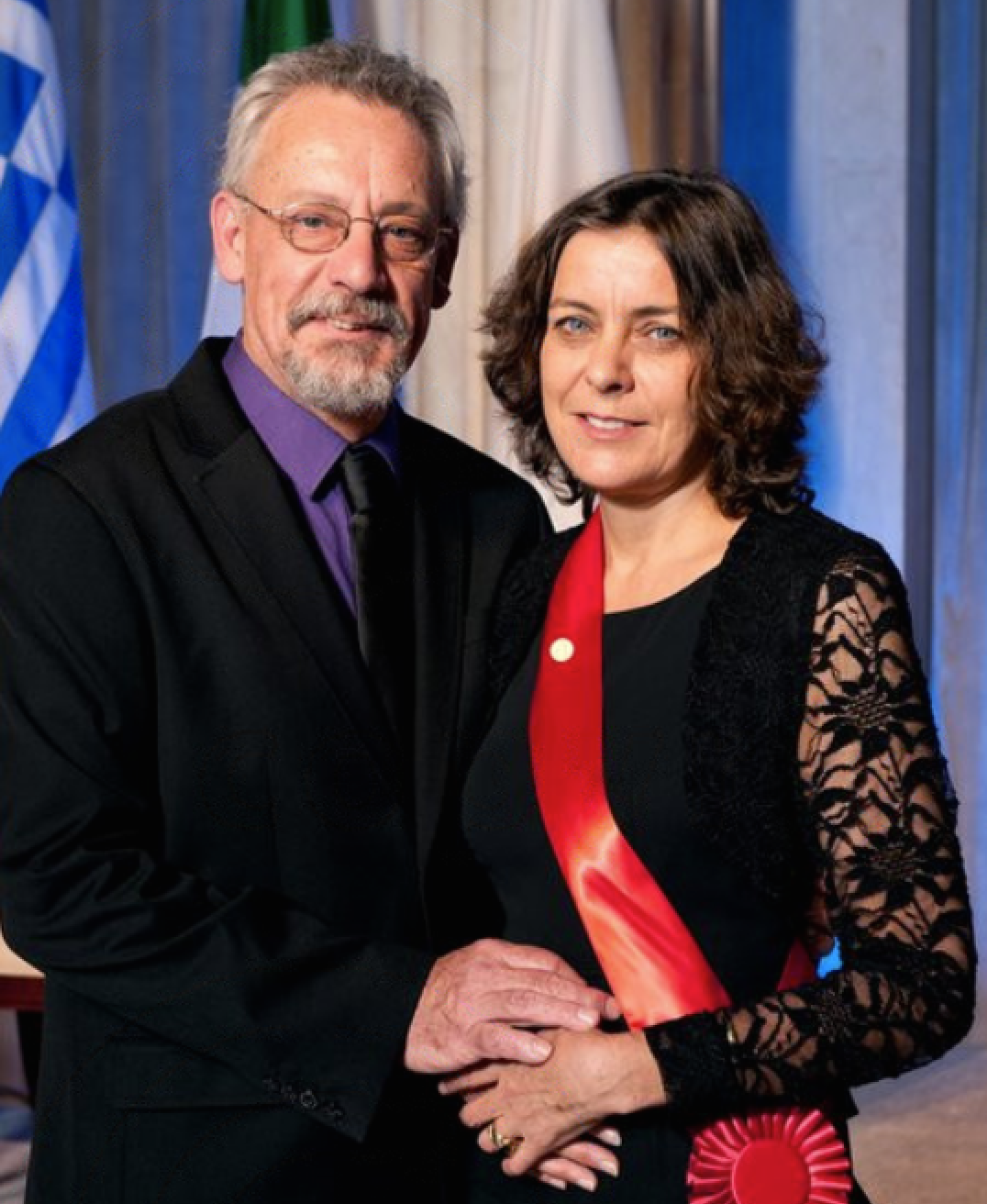
Banfield at the Franklin Award Ceremony with her husband Peregrine (Perry) Smith in April 2011

Banfield was educated at the Australian National University where she completed her bachelor's and master's degrees (1978–1985) both examining granite weathering. She attributes her initial interest in geomicrobiology to Dr Tony Eggleton who drew her attention to processes at the earth's surface, mineral weathering and the regolith.

Banfield graduated with a PhD in Earth and Planetary Sciences from Johns Hopkins University for high-resolution transmission electron microscopy (HRTEM) studies of metamorphic reactions supervised by David R. Veblen.

== Career and research ==
Banfield is an earth scientist who studies the structure, functioning and diversity of microbial communities in natural environments and the human microbiome.

Banfield was a Fulbright Student in Medicine from the Australian National University to Johns Hopkins University in 1988, and a Mac Arthur Fellow in 1999. She has been a professor at the University of Wisconsin–Madison from 1990 to 2001 and the University of Tokyo (1996–1998).

Since 2001, she has been a researcher and professor at the University of California Berkeley where she heads the geomicrobiology program and works as a researcher at the Lawrence Berkeley National Laboratory. Her research as of 2021 spans field sites in Northern California to Australia and covers subjects at the intersection of microbiology and geosciences, including genome-resolved metagenomics, genome editing tool development, astrobiology and microbial carbon capture.

In 2006, Banfield encouraged Jennifer Doudna to study CRISPR after finding the sequences pervasive and rapidly evolving across bacterial genomes. (Doudna went on to receive a Nobel Prize for her resulting groundbreaking CRISPR gene engineering technology).

In 2023, Banfield became the first woman to win the Leeuwenhoek Medal from the Royal Dutch Society for Microbiology, an award that has been given roughly every 10 years since 1875 to honor scientists who have made outstanding contributions to science, society and outreach in the field of microbiology.

== Work ==
=== Genome-Resolved Metagenomics ===
Banfield pioneered the development and application of genome-resolved metagenomics, a technique that allows for the reconstruction of individual genomes from complex microbial communities without the need for cultivation. This approach significantly expanded our understanding of microbial diversity and evolution.

=== Tree of Life Expansion ===
Through her work in genomics, Banfield's research group has provided insights into previously unknown bacterial and archaeal lineages. This has led to a substantial revision and expansion of the Tree of Life, adding entire new branches known as Candidate Phyla Radiation, reshaping our understanding of microbial evolution:

Within its lineages, evolution has gone to town, producing countless species that we’re almost completely ignorant about. With a single exception, they’ve never been isolated or grown in a lab. In fact, this supergroup and other lineages...clearly comprise the majority of life’s current diversity.

— Jillian Banfield, Most of the Tree of Life is a Complete Mystery, The Atlantic (2016)

=== Microorganism-Mineral Interactions ===
Banfield has made significant contributions to understanding how microorganisms interact with minerals. This includes studies on how these interactions can lead to the production of nanomaterials and influence geochemical cycles.

=== Microbiome Community Editing ===
Banfield's research has expanded to include innovative approaches for editing microbial communities, with applications in human health and climate change mitigation. In collaboration with Jennifer Doudna, Banfield has developed groundbreaking techniques for precision microbiome editing. Their work combines genome-resolved metagenomics with CRISPR genome editing to enable targeted modifications of specific genes in complex microbial communities. In 2023 they launched a $70 million initiative to apply microbiome editing to address global challenges in human and planetary health. For human health applications, the research focuses on editing the microbiome to prevent childhood asthma and other inflammatory diseases. In climate change mitigation efforts, the team is targeting methane-producing microbes in livestock to reduce agricultural methane emissions.

=== Honours and awards ===
- 2023 Leeuwenhoek Medal
- 2018 Elected a Fellow of the Royal Society (FRS).
- 2017 V.M. Goldschmidt Award, Geochemical Society
- 2015 Elected to the Australian Academy of Science (International Member)
- 2015 Honor doctorate, Ben Gurion University, Israel
- 2013 Award of Dr. sch. h.c. ETH Zurich, Switzerland
- 2011 L'Oréal-UNESCO Awards for Women in Science: North American Laureate
- 2011 Benjamin Franklin Medal in Earth and Environmental Science of the Franklin Institute
- 2010 Dana Medal of the Mineralogical Society of America
- 2007 Elected Fellow, The Geochemical Society
- 2007 ASM Division Q Lecturer (Environmental and General Applied Microbiology)
- 2006 Elected Fellow, American Academy of Microbiology
- 2006 Elected to the National Academy of Sciences
- 2005 Pioneer Lecturer, Clay Minerals Society, June 2005
- 2005 Rosenqvist Lecturer, Norway, May 2005
- 2000 Inaugural NSF Earth Science Week Lecturer
- 2000 Gast Lecturer, Geochemical Society
- 2000 John Simon Guggenheim Foundation Fellowship
- 2000 Marion L. and Christie M. Jackson Award of the Clay Minerals Society
- 1999 Fellow through 2004 MacArthur Foundation
- 1999 Faculty Achievement Award, UW-Madison
- 1999 D.A. Brown Medal, Australian National University
- 1998 H.I. Romnes Faculty Fellowship UW Madison
- 1997 Mineralogical Society of America Award
- 1988 Fulbright Scholar in Medicine at Johns Hopkins University
