= Donald Lewis Sparks =

American soil scientist (born 1953)

Donald L. Sparks
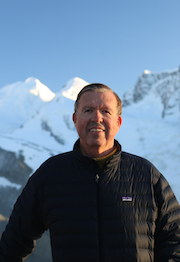
- University of Delaware Professor Donald Sparks at Matterhorn
- Education: Virginia Tech
- Awards: American Association for the Advancement of Science Fellow, Geochemistry Medal, Liebig Medal
- Scientific career
- Fields: Environmental Soil Geochemistry
- Institutions: University of Delaware

Donald L. Sparks (born June 26, 1953) is an American soil scientist, currently Unidel S. Hallock duPont Chair of Soil and Environmental Chemistry, Francis Alison Professor, Director, Delaware Environmental Institute, University of Delaware, and Hagler Fellow in the Hagler Institute for Advanced Study at Texas A&M University.

== Biography ==
Sparks received a B.S. in Agronomy in 1975 and an M.S. in Soil Science in 1976 from the University of Kentucky, Lexington, Kentucky, and a Ph.D. in Soil Science in 1979 from Virginia Polytechnic Institute and State University, Blacksburg, Virginia.

Sparks was president of the Soil Science Society of America (SSSA) in 2000, and the International Union of Soil Sciences from 2002-2006. For three years he chaired the U.S. National Committee for Soil Sciences, which advises the National Academy of Sciences.

Sparks was an early leader in promoting critical zone science and was principal investigator of one of the first six National Science Foundation (NSF) supported Critical Zone Observatories (CZO), the Christina River Basin Critical Zone Observatory (CRB-CZO).

In 2019-2020, he served on the National Academies Committee on Catalyzing Opportunities for Research in the Earth Sciences (CORES), a study focused on developing research recommendations for the National Science Foundation for the decade 2020-2030.

In 2021, the European Geosciences Union awarded Sparks the Philippe Duchaufour Medal for his influential research on soil chemistry and physical chemistry that helped develop the field of soil science. His work has transformed the understanding of kinetics of soil chemical processes, surface chemistry of soils and soil components, and the physical chemistry of soil potassium.

== Awards and honors ==
He is a Fellow of the American Association for the Advancement of Science, the Geochemical Society, the European Association of Geochemists, the American Society of Agronomy, and the Soil Science Society of America. He has received the Geochemistry Medal from the American Chemical Society, the Liebig Medal from the International Union of Soil Sciences, the McMaster Fellowship from the Australian Commonwealth Scientific and Industrial Research Organization (CSIRO), the Einstein Professorship from the Chinese Academy of Sciences, and the Pioneer in Clay Science Award from the Clay Minerals Society. He was President of the Soil Science Society of America and the International Union of Soil Sciences.

== Selected publications ==
- Fendorf, S.E.; M.J. Eick; P.R. Grossl; D.L. Sparks (February 1997). "Arsenate and Chromate Retention Mechanisms on Goethite. 1. Surface Structure". Environmental Science & Technology. 31 (2): 315–320. Bibcode:1997EnST...31..315F. doi:10.1021/ES950653T. ISSN 0013-936X. Wikidata Q105727422.
- Hochella, M.F. Jr.; S. K. Lower; P. A. Maurice; R. L. Penn; N. Sahai; D. L. Sparks; B. S. Twining (1 March 2008). "Nanominerals, mineral nanoparticles, and Earth systems". Science. 319 (5870): 1631–1635. doi:10.1126/SCIENCE.1141134. ISSN 0036-8075. PMID 18356515. Wikidata Q37115255.
- Arai, Y.; D. L. Sparks (September 2001). "ATR–FTIR Spectroscopic Investigation on Phosphate Adsorption Mechanisms at the Ferrihydrite–Water Interface". Journal of Colloid and Interface Science. 241 (2): 317–326. Bibcode:2001JCIS..241..317A. doi:10.1006/JCIS.2001.7773. ISSN 0021-9797. Wikidata Q105727455.
- Peak, D., R.G. Ford, and D.L. Sparks. 1999. An in-situ ATR-FTIR investigation of sulfate bonding mechanisms on goethite. J. Colloid Interf. Sci. 218:289-299.
- Amundson, R., A. A. Berhe, J. Hopmans, C. Olson, A. E. Sztein, and D. L. Sparks. 2015. Soil and human security in the 21st century. Science 348(6235) 1261071-12610716. DOI: 10.1126/science.1261071

=== Books ===
- Sparks, D.L. 1989. Kinetics of Soil Chemical Processes. Academic Press, New York.
- Sparks, D.L. 1995. Environmental soil chemistry, Academic Press, San Diego.
- Sparks, D.L. Environmental soil chemistry. 2002. 2nd edition. Academic Press, San Diego.
- Sparks, D.L. Environmental soil chemistry. 2023. 3rd edition. Academic Press, San Diego.
