= Michael Hochella =

American geoscientist

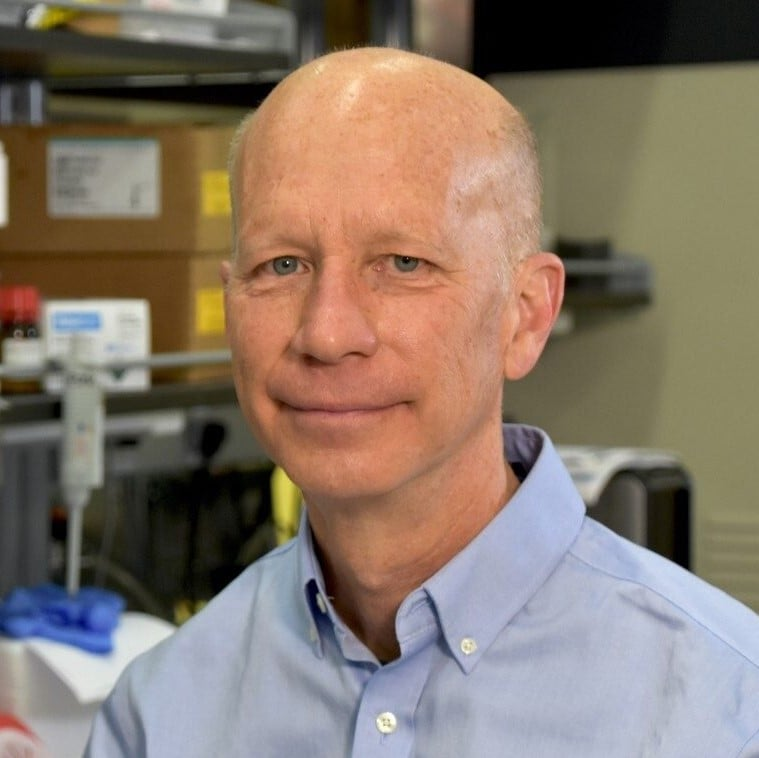
- Born: Michael F. Hochella Jr. 1953 (age 72–73); Yokohama, Japan
- Citizenship: United States
- Education: Virginia Tech (B.S., M.S.); Stanford University (Ph.D.)
- Awards: Member of the National Academy of Sciences (2026); C.C. Patterson Medal, Geochemical Society (2021); Geochemistry Medal, American Chemical Society (2021); Fellow of the American Association for the Advancement of Science (2007); Fellow of the American Geophysical Union (2006); Dana Medal (2002); Alexander von Humboldt Research Award (2001)
- Scientific career
- Fields: Geochemistry; Mineralogy; Nanogeoscience
- Workplaces: Virginia Tech; Stanford University; Pacific Northwest National Laboratory
- Doctoral advisor: Gordon E. Brown Jr.

Michael F. Hochella Jr. (born 1953) is an American geochemist, mineralogist, and a notable figure in the establishment of the field of nanogeoscience. He is University Distinguished Professor Emeritus at Virginia Tech, a former research professor at Stanford University, and a former Laboratory Fellow at the Pacific Northwest National Laboratory (PNNL). Hochella is recognized for pioneering the application of high-resolution microscopy and spectroscopy to mineral surfaces and nanoparticles, and for showing how nanoscale materials help govern geochemical cycles, pollutant behavior, and environmental and biological processes. He founded and directed the National Science Foundation supported center NanoEarth at Virginia Tech, one of the first national hubs in the world dedicated to environmental nanoscience.

Hochella has served as president of both the Geochemical Society and the Mineralogical Society of America, and has been elected a fellow of the American Association for the Advancement of Science (AAAS), the American Geophysical Union (AGU), the Mineralogical Society of America, the Geochemical Society, the European Association of Geochemistry, the Royal Society of Chemistry, Geological Society of America, and the International Association of GeoChemistry.

In 2026, Hochella was elected to the National Academy of Sciences.

== Early life and education ==
Hochella was born in 1953 in Yokohama, Japan at the end of the Korean War. His father, a decorated U.S. Army pilot in World War II flying B-25 aircraft, also flew in Korea. Shortly after Hochella’s birth, his family relocated multiple times due to his father’s military service, including postings in Fort Monmouth, New Jersey; Stuttgart, Germany; Poitiers, France; and Fort Huachuca, Arizona. Following his father’s retirement from active duty, the family settled in Bel Air, Maryland, where Hochella attended middle and high school.

He earned his B.S. (1975) and M.S. (1977) in Geological Sciences at Virginia Tech. He completed his Ph.D. in Geological and Environmental Sciences at Stanford University in 1981 under the supervision of Gordon E. Brown Jr.

== Academic career ==
After completing his doctorate, Hochella worked as a senior scientist at Corning Inc. from 1981 to 1983. He returned to Stanford University in 1983, serving as an acting assistant professor and senior research associate until 1989 and as an associate professor (research) from 1989 to 1992.

In 1992, Hochella joined the Department of Geosciences at Virginia Tech as an associate professor. He was promoted to professor in 1996. His research encompassed mineral surface geochemistry and environmental nanoscience and involved laboratory, instrumental, and field studies.

Hochella served as president of the Geochemical Society from 2000 to 2001. In June 2007, he was appointed University Distinguished Professor, Virginia Tech's highest faculty honor. He subsequently served as president of the Mineralogical Society of America in 2012.

Hochella founded and directed NanoEarth, a National Science Foundation-supported node of the National Nanotechnology Coordinated Infrastructure (NNCI). At the time NanoEarth joined the network, the NNCI comprised 16 sites supporting nanoscience and nanotechnology research across scientific and engineering disciplines.

In 2019, Hochella was named University Distinguished Professor Emeritus at Virginia Tech.

=== Pacific Northwest National Laboratory (2016–2025) ===
Hochella began collaborating with the Pacific Northwest National Laboratory (PNNL) in 1989. From 2016 to 2025, he held the positions of Laboratory Fellow and Senior Advisor at PNNL, supporting research in environmental nanotechnology and the nano–bio–geo interface.

== Research ==
=== Nanogeoscience ===
Hochella is considered one of the founders of nanogeoscience, a field that examines how natural and anthropogenic nanomaterials influence Earth processes. His work demonstrated that nanoscale minerals and materials regulate contaminant mobility, redox chemistry, nutrient availability, and microbial interactions.

=== Mineral surface geochemistry ===
He was among the earliest scientists to apply high-resolution scanning probe microscopies to mineral surfaces. His atomic-scale investigations established fundamental mechanisms of surface dissolution, growth, and chemical reactivity.

=== Environmental nanoparticles ===
Hochella's group identified environmentally significant nanoparticles from coal combustion, mine drainage, aqueous systems, and natural weathering. A 2019–2021 series of studies showed that titanium-oxide nanoparticles from coal burning can enter mammalian lungs and bloodstream, raising concerns about human exposure pathways. More recently, he has worked on the potential use of benign mineral-like engineered nanoparticles in ocean fertilization for large-scale atmospheric carbon dioxide removal.

=== Mineral–microbe interactions ===
His work revealed how microbes interact with mineral surfaces and nanoparticles, influencing nutrient cycles, biomineralization, environmental detoxification, and the formation of reactive mineral phases.

== Selected awards and honors ==
- Member of the National Academy of Sciences (2026)
- C.C. Patterson Award, Geochemical Society (2021)
- Geochemistry Medal, American Chemical Society Geochemistry Division (2021)
- Outstanding Faculty Award, State Council of Higher Education for Virginia (2016)
- Fellow of the International Association of GeoChemistry (2013)
- Fellow of the American Association for the Advancement of Science (2007)
- Geochemistry Fellow, Geochemical Society and European Association of Geochemistry (2007)
- Fellow of the American Geophysical Union (2006)
- Virginia Outstanding Scientist (2005)
- Dana Medal, Mineralogical Society of America (2002)
- Alexander von Humboldt Research Award (2001)
- Fellow of the Geological Society of America (1998)
- Fellow of the Mineralogical Society of America (1990)
- Fellow of the Royal Society of Chemistry

== Selected publications ==
- Michael F Hochella; Steven K Lower; Patricia A Maurice; R Lee Penn; Nita Sahai; Donald L Sparks; Benjamin S Twining (1 March 2008). "Nanominerals, mineral nanoparticles, and Earth systems". Science. 319 (5870): 1631–1635. doi:10.1126/science.1141134. ISSN 0036-8075. PMID 18356515. Wikidata Q37115255.
- Bojeong Kim; Chee-Sung Park; Mitsuhiro Murayama; Michael F Hochella (1 October 2010). "Discovery and characterization of silver sulfide nanoparticles in final sewage sludge products". Environmental Science & Technology. 44 (19): 7509–7514. doi:10.1021/es101565j. ISSN 0013-936X. PMID 20839838. Wikidata Q44959553.
- Steven K. Lower; Michael F. Hochella Jr.; Terry J. Beveridge (1 May 2001). "Bacterial recognition of mineral surfaces: nanoscale interactions between Shewanella and alpha-FeOOH". Science. 292 (5520): 1360–1363. Bibcode:2001Sci...292.1360L. doi:10.1126/science.1059567. ISSN 0036-8075. PMID 11359008. Wikidata Q43612428.
- Susan L. Stipp; Michael F. Hochella (June 1991). "Structure and bonding environments at the calcite surface as observed with X-ray photoelectron spectroscopy (XPS) and low energy electron diffraction (LEED)". Geochimica et Cosmochimica Acta. 55 (6): 1723–1736. Bibcode:1991GeCoA..55.1723S. doi:10.1016/0016-7037(91)90142-r. ISSN 0016-7037. Wikidata Q105727218.
- Marina E Vance; Todd Kuiken; Eric P Vejerano; Sean P McGinnis; Michael F Hochella; David Rejeski; Matthew S Hull (2015). "Nanotechnology in the real world: Redeveloping the nanomaterial consumer products inventory". Beilstein Journal of Nanotechnology. 6: 1769–80. doi:10.3762/bjnano.6.181. ISSN 2190-4286. PMC 4578396. PMID 26425429. Wikidata Q28389215.
- Hochella, Michael F.; Mogk, David W.; Ranville, James; Allen, Irving C.; Luther, George W.; Marr, Linsey C.; McGrail, B. Peter; Murayama, Mitsu; Qafoku, Nikolla P.; Rosso, Kevin M.; Sahai, Nita; Schroeder, Paul A.; Vikesland, Peter; Westerhoff, Paul; Yang, Yi (2019-03-29). "Natural, incidental, and engineered nanomaterials and their impacts on the Earth system". Science. 363 (6434). doi:10.1126/science.aau8299. hdl:10919/93142. ISSN 0036-8075.
- Babakhani, Peyman; Phenrat, Tanapon; Baalousha, Mohammed; Soratana, Kullapa; Peacock, Caroline L.; Twining, Benjamin S.; Hochella, Michael F. (2022). "Potential use of engineered nanoparticles in ocean fertilization for large-scale atmospheric carbon dioxide removal". Nature Nanotechnology. 17 (12): 1342–1351. doi:10.1038/s41565-022-01226-w. ISSN 1748-3395. PMC 9747614. PMID 36443601.
- Schindler, Michael, et al. “Abiotic and Biotic-Controlled Nanomaterial Formation Pathways within the Earth’s Nanomaterial Cycle.” Communications Earth & Environment [London], vol. 5, no. 1, no. 646, (November 2024)Abiotic and Biotic Controlled Nanomaterial Formation Pathways Within the Earth's Nanomaterial Cycle

== Personal life ==
Hochella met his wife, Barbara M. Bekken, at Stanford University, where she completed her Ph.D. in 1990. They have two children.
