= C. B. van Niel =

Dutch-American microbiologist (1897–1985)

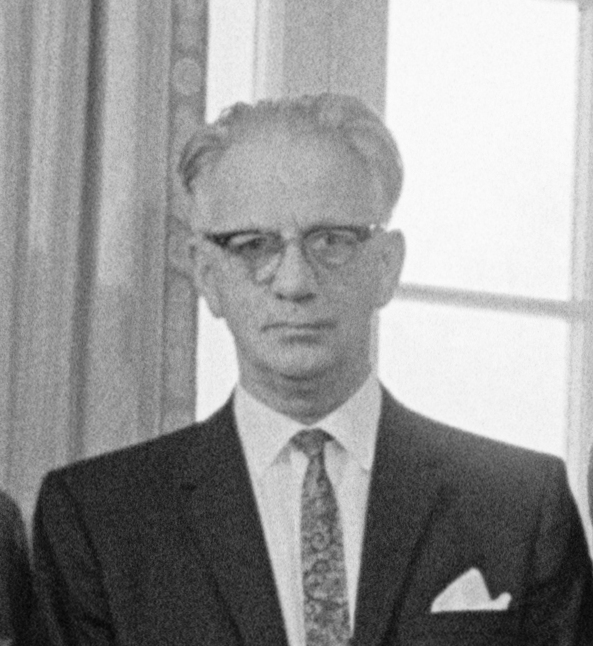
- van Niel in 1964
- Born: Cornelis Bernardus van Niel; November 4, 1897; Haarlem, Netherlands
- Died: March 10, 1985 (aged 87); Carmel, California, U.S.
- Education: TU Delft
- Known for: Chemistry of photosynthesis
- Awards: National Medal of Science (1963); Leeuwenhoek Medal (1970)
- Scientific career
- Fields: Microbiology
- Workplaces: Hopkins Marine Station
- Doctoral advisor: Albert Kluyver
- Doctoral students: Roger Stanier

Cornelis Bernardus van Niel (also known as Kees van Niel; November 4, 1897 – March 10, 1985) was a Dutch-American microbiologist. He introduced the study of general microbiology to the United States and made key discoveries explaining the chemistry of photosynthesis.

== Early life ==
In 1923, Cornelis van Niel graduated in chemical engineering at Delft University and became an assistant to Albert Kluyver, who had initiated the field of comparative biochemistry. In 1925 he married Christina van Hemert in Bloemendaal, North Holland, Netherlands. In 1928 he wrote his PhD dissertation ('The Propionic Acid Bacteria') after which he left for the United States to continue his work at the Hopkins Marine Station of Stanford University.

== Work and discoveries ==
=== Photosynthesis (1931) ===
By studying purple sulphur bacteria and green sulphur bacteria he was the first scientist to demonstrate, in 1931, that photosynthesis is a light-dependent redox reaction in which hydrogen from an oxidizable compound reduces carbon dioxide to cellular materials. Expressed as:

2 H_{2}A + CO_{2} → 2A + CH_{2}O + H_{2}O

where A is the electron acceptor. His discovery predicted that H_{2}O is the hydrogen donor in green plant photosynthesis and is oxidized to O_{2}. The chemical summation of photosynthesis was a milestone in the understanding of the chemistry of photosynthesis. This was later experimentally verified by Robert Hill.

In a nutshell, van Niel proved that plants give off oxygen as a result of splitting water molecules during photosynthesis, not carbon dioxide molecules as thought before.

=== Bacterial taxonomy ===
Van Niel also played a key role in the development of bacterial taxonomy. In 1962, van Niel in collaboration with Roger Y. Stanier defined prokaryotes as cells in which the nuclear material is not surrounded by a nuclear membrane, a definition that is still used to date.

=== Teaching ===
Shortly after his arrival at Hopkins Marine Station, van Niel developed a course in general microbiology which was to become widely influential. During its run from 1938 to 1962, the course drew students from around the world, and included several accomplished scientists among its alumni, including Esther Lederberg and Allan Campbell. and Arthur Kornberg, the recipient of the 1959 Nobel prize for DNA synthesis.

== Scientific legacy and awards ==
Van Niel was the first biologist to receive the American National Medal of Science; he was awarded the 1963 Medal in biological sciences for "his fundamental investigations of the comparative biochemistry of microorganisms, for his studies of the basic mechanisms of photosynthesis, and for his excellence as a teacher of many scientists." Additional awards include:

- 1955: Marjory Stephenson Prize of the Society for General Microbiology
- 1966: Charles F. Kettering Award of the American Society of Plant Biologists
- 1967: Rumford Prize
- 1970: Leeuwenhoek Medal

van Niel was elected to the United States National Academy of Sciences in 1945 and the American Philosophical Society in 1948. In 1950 van Niel became a correspondent of the Royal Netherlands Academy of Arts and Sciences and was elected to the American Academy of Arts and Sciences in 1950.

== Selected publications ==
- Stanier, R. Y.; van Niel, C. B. (1962). "The concept of a bacterium". Archiv für Mikrobiologie. 42 (1): 17–35. Bibcode:1962ArMic..42...17S. doi:10.1007/BF00425185. PMID 13916221. S2CID 29859498.
