= Albert Kluyver =

Dutch microbiologist and biochemist and fellow of the Royal Society

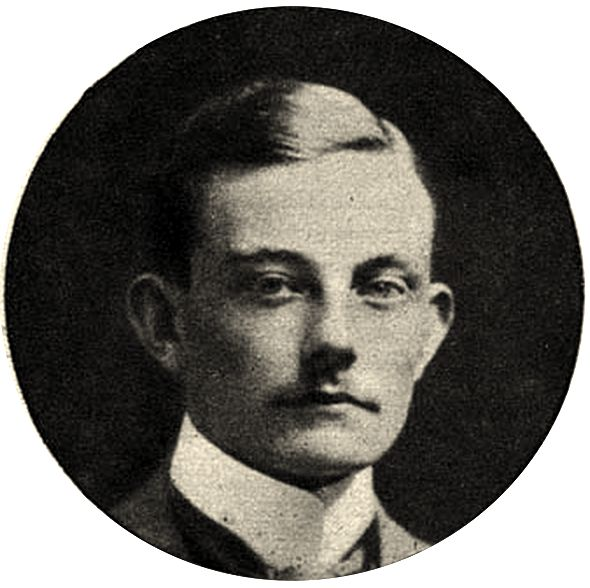
- Born: Albert Jan Kluyer; 3 June 1888; Breda, Netherlands
- Died: 4 May 1956 (aged 67)
- Awards: Fellow of the Royal Society; Copley Medal (1953)
- Scientific career
- Fields: Microbiology; Biochemistry

Albert Jan Kluyver ForMemRS (3 June 1888 – 14 May 1956) was a Dutch microbiologist and biochemist.

== Career ==
In 1926, Kluyver and Hendrick Jean Louis Donker published the now classic paper, "Die Einheit in der Biochemie" ("Unity in Biochemistry"). The paper helped establish Kluyver's vision that, at a biochemical level, all organisms are unified. Kluyver famously expressed the idea with the aphorism: "From elephant to butyric acid bacterium – it is all the same". The paper, and other work from Kluyver's lab, helped support both the concept of biochemical unity as well as the idea of "comparative biochemistry", which Kluyver envisioned as biochemically equivalent to comparative anatomy. The concept established a theoretical basis for studying chemical processes in bacteria and extrapolating those processes to higher organisms.

The concepts of "biochemical unity" and "comparative biochemistry" were both very influential and probably Kluyver's most significant work. Kluyver's best known student, C. B. van Niel, commented on his mentor's scientific influence and noted that by the middle of the 20th century, his work on biochemical unity was no longer cited. His aphorism was sufficiently widespread that in 1961 François Jacob and Jacques Monod paraphrased it, without mentioning Kluyver, as "that old axiom 'what is true for bacteria is also true for elephants'" to justify the genetic code's universality. His career was profoundly influenced by World War II and the Nazi occupation of the Netherlands.

== Awards and honours ==
Kluyver is associated with the Delft school of microbiology where he was the successor to Martinus Beijerinck. In 1926 he became a member of the Royal Netherlands Academy of Arts and Sciences. He is considered the father of comparative microbiology. In 1953, he won the Copley medal.

In 1956, botanist Johannes P. Van der Walt published Kluyveromyces, which is a genus of ascomycetous yeasts in the family Saccharomycetaceae and named in Kluyver's honour. In 1981, the genus Kluyvera comprising bacteria from the former enteric group 8 was named after him.

The Royal Netherlands Society for Microbiology (KNVM) established an award named after him for microbiologists who have made an exceptional contribution to the field.

== See also ==
- Clostridium kluyveri
