= Barry R. Bickmore =

Geologist and Mormon apologist

Barry Robert Bickmore
- Education: Virginia Polytechnic Institute and State University
- Known for: Climate change communication
- Spouse: Keiko Ann Guay
- Children: Three
- Scientific career
- Fields: Geochemistry
- Thesis: Atomic force microscopy study of clay mineral dissolution (1999)
- Doctoral advisor: Michael F. Hochella

Barry Robert Bickmore is a professor in the department of geological sciences at Brigham Young University (BYU). He is also a devout Mormon, having written Restoring the Ancient Church: Joseph Smith and Early Christianity (Ben Lomond: FAIR, 1999) as well as several articles that have been published in the FARMS Review.

Bickmore was born in Redwood City, California, and raised in California and Utah. He served as a missionary for the Church of Jesus Christ of Latter-day Saints (LDS Church) in Iowa. He obtained a degree in geology with minors in philosophy and chemistry from BYU. He then received a Ph.D. in geochemistry from Virginia Polytechnic Institute and State University, where his advisor was Michael F. Hochella. He then was a postdoctoral research assistant at the University of Colorado for about a year and a half prior to joining the BYU faculty in August 2001.

Bickmore, a conservative Republican, is known for his activism in support of action to combat global warming, such as when he criticized a proposed bill in Utah that described climate change as a hoax. The bill passed in spite of Bickmore's efforts to defeat it.

Among other callings in the LDS Church, Bickmore has served as a seminary teacher.

In geochemistry and related fields, Bickmore has focused on the study of low-temperature geochemical reactions and the development of geoscience curricula as part of the curriculum of elementary education majors.
