= Photosynthesis Research =

Peer-reviewed scientific journal

- Discipline: Biology
- Language: English
- Edited by: Johannes Messinger

Publication details
- History: 1980–present
- Publisher: Springer Science+Business Media on behalf of the International Society of Photosynthesis Research
- Frequency: Quarterly
- Open access: Hybrid
- Impact factor: 3.429 (2021)

Standard abbreviations
- ISO 4: Photosynth. Res.

Indexing
- CODEN: PHRSDI
- ISSN: 1573-5079 (print); 0166-8595 (web)
- LCCN: 83009006
- OCLC no.: 06802818

Links
- Journal homepage; Online archive

Photosynthesis Research is a quarterly peer-reviewed scientific journal covering various aspects of photosynthesis. It is published by Springer Science+Business Media on behalf of the International Society of Photosynthesis Research and was established in 1980. The editor-in-chief is Johannes Messinger (Uppsala University).

The journal publishes research articles, reviews, and commentaries related to photosynthesis, including its biochemistry, biophysics, molecular biology, and physiology.

== Abstracting and indexing ==
The journal is abstracted and indexed in:

- Biological Abstracts
- BIOSIS Previews
- CAB Abstracts
- Current Contents/Agriculture, Biology & Environmental Sciences
- EBSCO databases
- ProQuest databases
- Science Citation Index Expanded
- Scopus

According to the Journal Citation Reports, the journal has a 2021 impact factor of 3.429.
