= Clostridium kluyveri =

Scientific classification
- Domain: Bacteria
- Kingdom: Bacillati
- Phylum: Bacillota
- Class: Clostridia
- Order: Eubacteriales
- Family: Clostridiaceae
- Genus: Clostridium
- Species: C. kluyveri

Binomial name
- Clostridium kluyveri Barker and Taha 1942

Species of bacterium

Clostridium kluyveri (CLOKL) is an anaerobic, motile, gram-positive bacterium. It is named after the Dutch microbiologist Albert Kluyver.
