= Nanogeoscience =

Study of nanoscale phenomena related to geological systems

Nanogeoscience is the study of nanoscale phenomena related to geological systems. Predominantly, this is investigated by studying environmental nanoparticles between 1–100 nanometers in size. Other applicable fields of study include studying materials with at least one dimension restricted to the nanoscale (e.g. thin films, confined fluids) and the transfer of energy, electrons, protons, and matter across environmental interfaces.

== The atmosphere ==
As more dust enters the atmosphere due to the consequences of human activity (from direct effects, such as clearing of land and desertification, versus indirect effects, such as global warming), it becomes more important to understand the effects of mineral dust on the gaseous composition of the atmosphere, cloud formation conditions, and global-mean radiative forcing (i.e., heating or cooling effects).

== The ocean ==
Oceanographers generally study particles that measure 0.2 micrometres and larger, which means a lot of nanoscale particles are not examined, particularly with respect to formation mechanisms.

== The soils ==
Water–rock–bacteria nanoscience
Although by no means developed, nearly all aspects (both geo- and bioprocesses) of weathering, soil, and water–rock interaction science are inexorably linked to nanoscience. Within the Earth's near-surface, materials that are broken down, as well as materials that are produced, are often in the nanoscale regime. Further, as organic molecules, simple and complex, as well as bacteria and all flora and fauna in soils and rocks interact with the mineral components present, nanodimensions and nanoscale processes are the order of the day.

Metal transport nanoscience
On land, researchers study how nanosized minerals capture toxins such as arsenic, copper, and lead from the soil. Facilitating this process, called soil remediation, is a tricky business.

Nanogeoscience is in a relatively early stage of development. The future directions of nanoscience in the geosciences will include a determination of the identity, distribution, and unusual chemical properties of nanosized particles and/or films in the oceans, on the continents, and in the atmosphere, and how they drive Earth processes in unexpected ways. Further, nanotechnology will be the key to developing the next generation of Earth and environmental sensing systems.

== Size-dependent stability and reactivity of nanoparticles ==
Nanogeoscience deals with structures, properties and behaviors of nanoparticles in soils, aquatic systems and atmospheres. One of the key features of nanoparticles is the size-dependence of the nanoparticle stability and reactivity. This arises from the large specific surface area and differences in surface atomic structure of nanoparticles at small particle sizes. In general, the free energy of nanoparticles is inversely proportional to their particle size. For materials that can adopt two or more structures, size-dependent free energy may result in phase stability crossover at certain sizes. Free energy reduction drives crystal growth (atom-by-atom or by oriented attachment), which may again drive the phase transformation due to the change of the relative phase stability at increasing sizes. These processes impact the surface reactivity and mobility of nanoparticles in natural systems.

Well-identified size-dependent phenomena of nanoparticles include:

- Phase stability reversal of bulk (macroscopic) particles at small sizes. Usually, a less stable bulk-phase at low temperature (and/or low pressure) becomes more stable than the bulk-stable phase as the particle size decreases below a certain critical size. For instance, bulk anatase (TiO_{2}) is metastable with respect to bulk rutile (TiO_{2}). However, in air, anatase becomes more stable than rutile at particle sizes below 14 nm. Similarly, below 1293 K, wurtzite (ZnS) is less stable than sphalerite (ZnS). In vacuum, wurtzite becomes more stable than sphalerite when the particle size is less than 7 nm at 300 K. At very small particle sizes, the addition of water to the surface of ZnS nanoparticles can induce a change in nanoparticle structure and surface-surface interactions can drive a reversible structural transformation upon aggregation/disaggregation. Other examples of size-dependent phase stability include systems of Al_{2}O_{3}, ZrO_{2}, C, CdS, BaTiO_{3}, Fe_{2}O_{3}, Cr_{2}O_{3}, Mn_{2}O_{3}, Nb_{2}O_{3}, Y_{2}O_{3}, and Au-Sb.
- Phase transformation kinetics is size-dependent and transformations usually occur at low temperatures (less than several hundred degrees). Under such conditions, rates of surface nucleation and bulk nucleation are low due to their high activation energies. Thus, phase transformation occurs predominantly via interface nucleation that depends on contact between nanoparticles. As a consequence, the transformation rate is particle number (size)-dependent and it proceeds faster in densely packed (or highly aggregated) than in loosely packed nanoparticles. Complex concurrent phase transformation and particle coarsening often occur in nanoparticles.
- Size-dependent adsorption on nanoparticles and oxidation of nanominerals.

These size-dependent properties highlight the importance of the particle size in nanoparticle stability and reactivity.
