= Pale Yin =

Burmese deity

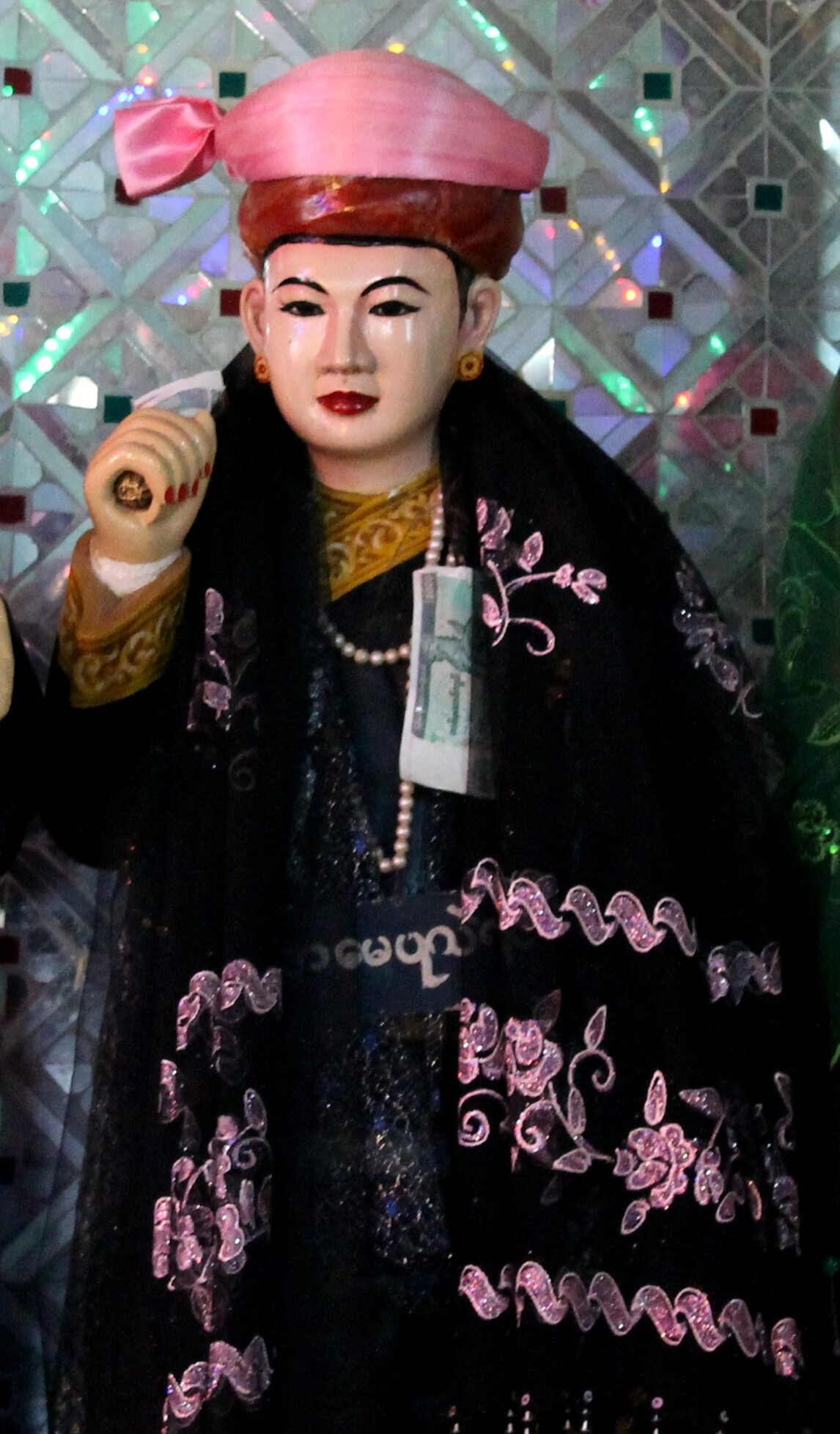
Statue of Pale Yin at a shrine in Mount Popa.

Pale Yin (Burmese: ပုလဲရင်; lit. 'Gentle Lady Pearl', also spelt Palei Yin) is a Burmese nat (deity) and sister of Ko Myo Shin. She is the guardian spirit who protects the region around the Chindwin and Ayeyarwaddy river basins. Pale Yin is mainly worshipped in central Myanmar and in Shan State.

== Representation ==
Pale Yin is portrayed in statues standing with one hand hanging down and the other resting on her belly. She wears long tasselled earrings, a type of jewelry linked to the middle classes of Inwa fashion.

== Legends ==
Legend has it that Pale Yin was a princess of the Padaung Kingdom (modern-day Pyay), the daughter of the ruler Min Hla Sithu and his consort Kuni Devi. She had a brother, Ko Myo Shin, as well as an adopted brother, Min Kyawzwa, a cavalry chief who secretly harbored feelings for her and wanted to marry her. One day, Hkuncho and Hkuntha, two young princes from Mong Ping, a tributary of Padaung, were placed in Pale Yin's care. After their father was killed in a rebellion, they were taken to Padaung for safety.

Min Kyawzwa thought he could adopt one of them because he brought princes to Padaung. But the king became worried about Min Kyawzwa's rude behavior, and instead of giving him custody of the princes, he gave him the town of Pakhan as an appanage. Min Kyawzwa was angry because he felt slighted, so he started planning to take the throne and make Pale Yin his queen. To quell continuing uprisings and deceit, Min Kyawzwa dispatched two princes to rule Shan State for roughly three years after Hkuncho and Hkuntha reached adulthood. Pale Yin and his brother Ko Myo Shin fled to Kyaukhtet village after Min Kyawzwa and his followers attacked the royal palace and killed the king and queen. In some versions of the legend, Pale Yin is said to have married Min Kyawzwa and become his queen.

Pale Yin once took an oath from Ko Myo Shin that she would never get married before heading out to find Hkuncho and Hkuntha. However, after a year, Pale Yin gave birth to a daughter named Thel Thel Lay after falling in love with Maung Lat, the village chief's son. Following Ko Myo Shin's death and his deification as a nat, he returned to Pale Yin and, heartbroken to discover that she had broken her oath, took her soul so that she too became a nat. Being separated from her daughter was unbearable for Pale Yin as a spirit. When the child was sleeping in her cradle, she changed into a cat and jumped on top of her. Thel Thel Lay died from the shock and also turned into a nat. In addition to being deified as a nat, Maung Lat died shortly after becoming distraught over the loss of his wife and daughter. Overcome with grief at the loss of his wife and daughter, Maung Lat died soon after and was also deified as a nat.

Min Hla Sithu, who had died earlier and was deified as a nat, ordered Ko Myo Shin to serve as the guardian deity of the towns and villages that had been his appanage during his princely life. Pale Yin and her nat family were assigned to assist Ko Myo Shin. According to some nat kadaw (spirit mediums), Pale Yin dislikes being worshipped at the same shrine as Min Kyawzwa, as he killed her entire family.

The legend of Ko Thein Shin, another nat and guardian spirit of the Kyaukse region, intertwines with theirs. This led to confusion in many academic accounts, with a few sources even wrongly describing Pale Yin as a wife of King Anawrahta of Pagan and as Se Kadaw (lit. "The Lady of the Running Water"), the sister of Ko Thein Shin.
