= Ko Myo Shin =

Burmese deity

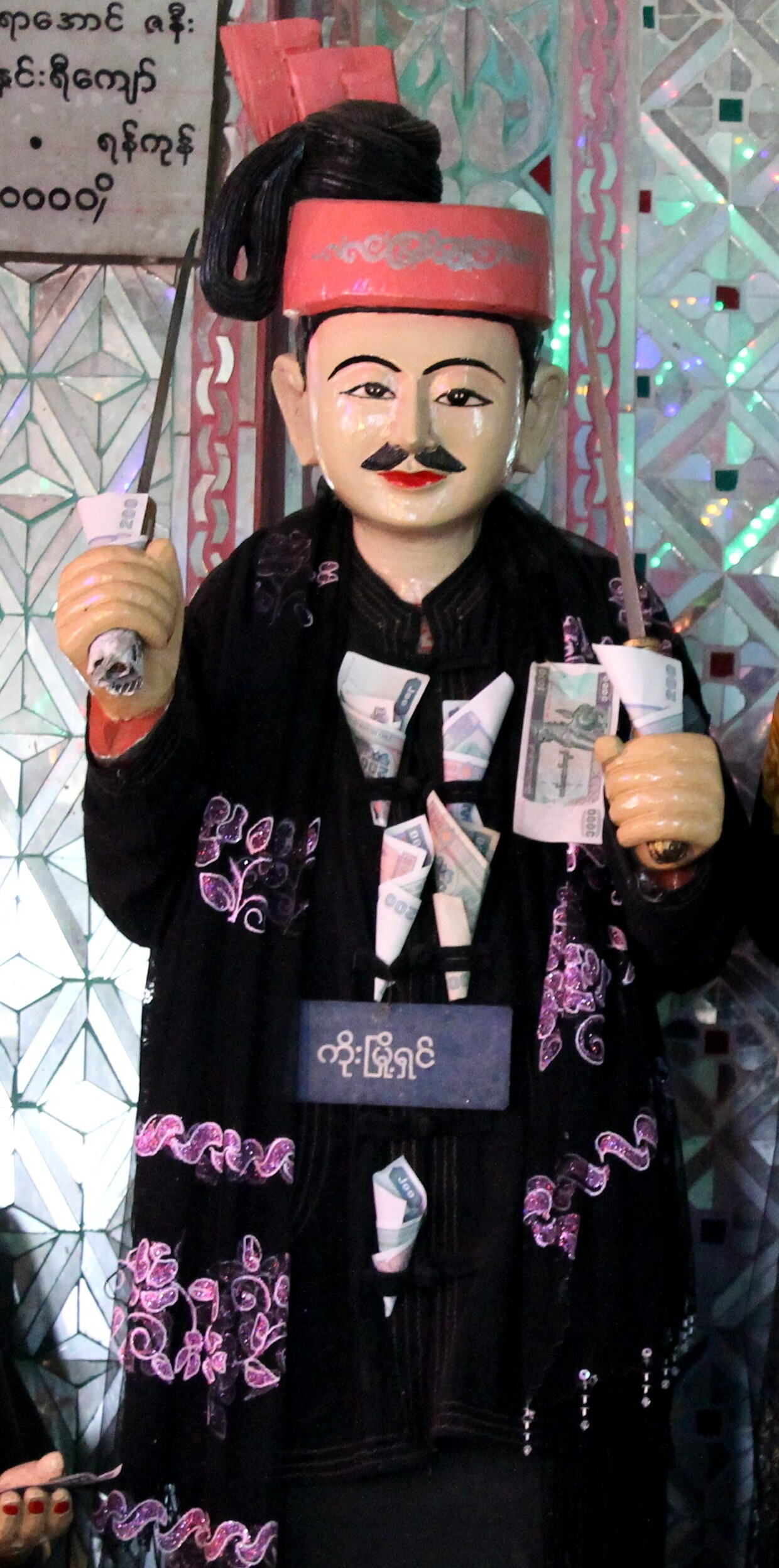
Statue of Ko Myo Shin at a shrine in Mount Popa.

Ko Myo Shin (Burmese: ကိုးမြို့ရှင်; lit. 'Lord of the Nine Towns') is a Burmese nat and the guardian spirit of the Bago region. He is widely venerated in central Myanmar and is considered one of the most powerful nats outside the official pantheon of the 37 nats. Devotees worship him for protection, success in business, and safe travel.

Ko Myo Shin's legend is often conflated with that of Ko Thein Shin, another nat who serves as the guardian spirit of the Kyaukse hill region. This confusion has led to the merging of their two legends in many scholarly accounts.

== Legends ==
According to legend, Ko Myo Shin was the son of Min Hla Sithu, the ruler of Padaung Kingdom (present-day Pyay), and his consort Kuni Devi. He was the heir apparent and was granted the appanage of nine towns, from which he came to be known as Ko Myo Shin ('Lord of the Nine Towns'). He also had a younger sister named Pale Yin.

During this period, Saw Thiha, the saopha of Kengtawng, revolted against Sao Khun Kyi, the saopha of Mong Ping, a tributary of Min Hla Sithu. In response, Saw Thiha requested military assistance from Min Hla Sithu to secure his own position. Min Hla Sithu ordered his son Ko Myo Shin, and his adopted son and military commander Min Kyawzwa to intervene in support of Mong Ping.

By the time their forces reached Mong Ping, Sao Khun Kyi had died, and the state had already fallen to Saw Thiha. The Padaung army subsequently subdued Mong Ping, deposed Saw Thiha, and installed a new ruler. The army brought Sao Khun Kyi's two underage sons, Hkuncho and Hkuntha, back to Padaung for protection. Once in Padaung, both Min Kyawzwa and Ko Myo Shin requested to adopt the Shan brothers. The king was concerned about granting the adoption to Min Kyawzwa, who was known as a heavy drinker and gambler. Yet, he also feared that granting the adoption to Ko Myo Shin would cause Min Kyawzwa to become resentful. To settle the dispute, the king granted Min Kyawzwa the appanage of Pakhan. He then adopted the Shan brothers in favor of Ko Myo Shin's sister, Pale Yin. Min Kyawzwa began harboring resentment toward the king from that moment.

When Hkuncho and Hkuntha came of age, Min Kyawzwa petitioned the king. He sought permission for the Shan princes to administer the Shan states for about three years to suppress ongoing rebellions. The king granted permission, and the Shan brothers departed. One night, however, Min Kyawzwa and his followers attacked the royal palace and assassinated the king and his consort, Kuni Devi. During the assault, Ko Myo Shin and Pale Yin escaped. They fled to an ally, the headman of Kyaukhtet village where they lived in obscurity while in hiding. Ko Myo Shin left his younger sister in the care of a wealthy headman's household, and set out in search of Hkuncho and Hkuntha. During that time, Pale Yin was betrothed to the headman's son, Maung Lat, and later gave birth to a daughter named The The Lay.

When Hkuncho and Hkuntha returned to the kingdom, Min Kyawzwa deceived them. He claimed he had seized the throne for them, as he was too old and wished to renounce monastic and dharma affairs. After persuading them, he made them swear an oath to follow his command. Following the oath, he asked Hkuncho and Hkuntha to find and behead Ko Myo Shin. Because they had sworn loyalty, the brothers searched for him. They eventually found Ko Myo Shin in a forest. Out of love for their foster father, they refused to strike him and explained everything. Moved by their filial affection, Ko Myo Shin himself sacrificed his head to fulfill the oath.

After becoming a nat, Ko Myo Shin visited Pale Yin. He discovered she had broken her promise not to marry. Heartbroken by her broken vow, Ko Myo Shin took his sister with him to the spirit world, and Pale Yin also became a nat. In the official legend, Ko Myo Shin's father, Min Hla Sithu, who had died earlier and also become a nat, ordered his son to guard the towns and villages that had once been his princely estate. Another version presents a different account: King Min Kyawzwa, fearing Ko Myo Shin's revenge, made him guardian of the Nine Towns to quiet his restless spirit. But revenge could not be stopped. Ko Myo Shin brought a champak tree down on Min Kyawzwa's mansion, killing him, his mother Shwegaing Medaw, and the mansion keeper, U Nyo. All three later became nats. In the official legend, the tree-cutting was the work of Hkuncho and Hkuntha, who were subsequently slain by Min Kyawzwa.

A different legend recorded during the colonial period identifies Ko Myo Shin with another nat, Aungzwamagyi, who served faithfully under King Narapatisithu. After being unjustly executed, he became a nat, and the king ordered the nine Shan saophas to build a shrine in his honor and pay homage. In this version, Ko Myo Shin Aungzwamagyi is portrayed as a loyal guardian spirit of the Burmese kings. He is even credited with aiding them in achieving military victories during a Burmese invasion of Siam.

In Kachin State, Ko Myo Shin is sometimes equated with Sao Sam Long Hpa, a legendary Shan hero and former ruler of Mogaung (Mong Kawng). Like Ko Myo Shin, Sao Sam Long Hpa was betrayed and met an unjust death, after which he became the guardian spirit of his region. As a result of this identification, Ko Myo Shin was reinterpreted in Shan cultural contexts and portrayed as a Shan nat.

== Conflations ==
Ko Myo Shin is often conflated with Ko Thein Shin, the guardian spirit of the Kyaukse Nine Agricultural Districts. The confusion mainly stems from their names, both beginning with "Ko" (nine), leading to errors in several scholarly accounts. However, they are distinct deities: Ko Myo Shin originates from the central Burmese plains, while Ko Thein Shin hails from the Shan states. Because Ko Myo Shin's legend has become intertwined with Ko Thein Shin's, some sources mistakenly identify him as a Shan nat. He is even venerated in certain Shan regions as a traditional Shan deity. A 1975 film even depicted Ko Myo Shin as the patron spirit of Shan State.

== Adoption in Shan traditions ==
Shan village guardian spirits are traditionally unnamed and lacked visual representations. Recently, however, portraits of Ko Myo Shin have been donated and placed in Shan shrines that previously lacked images. This phenomenon illustrates how a named, personified spirit from the Burmese cultural realm has replaced an unnamed, imageless local spirit. For instance, the original nameless guardian spirit, Bo Bo Gyi (lit. 'Big Grandfather'), has been replaced in a shrine in Hsipaw by new images of Ko Myo Shin and his sister, who are now the main focus of worship.

== Worship ==
Shrines dedicated to Ko Myo Shin can be found throughout Myanmar, particularly in central Myanmar and Shan State. His most notable shrines are in Taunggyi and Pyin Oo Lwin. He is also enshrined in the Kuni Shrine in Pakhan, Magway Region where Min Kyawzwa is venerated as the main deity. Another major shrine is located in Tachileik. The older shrine was built in the 1960s and renovated by locals in 2013; it remains highly revered in the region.

Pyin Oo Lwin is also home to a major shrine dedicated to the nat. A custom at the Defence Services Academy (DSA) requires officer cadets to pay respects to the nats at the Ko Myo Shin shrine five days before their graduation. This ritual is believed to ensure a prosperous and successful military career.

When passing spirit shrines at town and village entrances, drivers frequently honk their horns and show respect while making offerings of candles, cigarettes, and betel nuts. People also present aung thabyay (laurel branches) at the Ko Myo Shin shrine when buying or selling cars or other goods. The novice monks are customarily brought before the Ko Myo Shin shrine as part of the Shinbyu (novitiation) ceremonies.

== In popular culture ==
Ko Myo Shin was depicted in the 1957 film Ko Myo Shin, directed by Saya Myint.
