= Hkuncho Hkuntha =

Duo of Shan nats (deities) in the Burmese pantheon of nats

Hkuncho Hkuntha (Burmese: ခွန်ချို ခွန်သာ) are a duo of Shan nats (deities) in the Burmese pantheon of nats. They were Shan princes and adoptive sons of Ko Myo Shin and Pale Yin.

== Legends ==
According to legend, Hkuncho and Hkuntha were the sons of Sao Khun Kyi, the saopha of Mong Ping. At that time, Mong Ping was a tributary of the Pandaung Kingdom and was facing an invasion from Saw Thiha, the saopha of Kengtawng. During the conflict, their father was killed by Saw Thiha, and the two brothers were brought back to Pandaung for protection by Min Kyawzwa and Ko Myo Shin, princes of Pandaung who had come to assist them.

When they arrived in Pandaung, they requested King Min Hla Sithu to allow the adoption of the two Shan princes. However, the king granted the adoption to Ko Myo Shin and his sister Pale Yin instead, as Min Kyawzwa was known to be a heavy drinker and gambler with rude behavior. From that moment, Min Kyawzwa harbored deep resentment toward the king. Hkuncho and Hkuntha regarded Ko Myo Shin and Pale Yin as their true parents and were well instructed under their guidance. When Hkuncho and Hkuntha came of age, Min Kyawzwa began planning to seize the throne. To quell the ongoing uprisings and deceit, he ordered the two brothers to return and govern Mong Ping for about three years. When they arrived, however, they found the state peaceful and free of unrest. Nevertheless, in obedience to the order, they assumed the role of saophas of Mong Ping.

After three years, Hkuncho and Hkuntha returned to Pandaung to find that Min Kyawzwa had seized the throne. He claimed to have done so on their behalf, stating that he was too old to rule and wished to withdraw into monastic and religious life. To convince them, he placed the brothers on the throne of Pandaung and made them swear an oath of loyalty to his command. Min Kyawzwa then ordered them to behead Ko Myo Shin. Bound by their oath, the brothers searched for him and eventually found him in a forest. Out of filial devotion, they refused to kill him and explained the situation. Moved by their devotion, Ko Myo Shin willingly beheaded himself so that the brothers would not break their vow.

Hkuncho and Hkuntha took the head of Ko Myo Shin to Min Kyawzwa, who was waiting for them at Gwaycho Hill. After they presented the head, Min Kyawzwa immediately killed them. The two brothers became nats and, in their vengeance, cut down a champak tree near Min Kyawzwa's mansion, which fell and killed him along with his family.

According to one version of the legend, Hkuncho and Hkuntha, the two sons of a Shan saopha, were injected with magical medicine by a Shan monk, which granted them supernatural powers but also made them ferocious and violent. As a result, U Min Kyaw (Min Kyawzwa) and the minister Panya Bala were sent to capture them. Along the way, Panya Bala attempted to kill the princes, but U Min Kyaw intervened, saved their lives, and brought them back to the kingdom. When they arrived, the king allowed only Ko Myo Shin and his sister Pale Yin to adopt them. Humiliated and resentful, U Min Kyaw later plotted to seize the throne.

Hkuncho and Hkuntha also appear in the legend of Mount Sawbwa (Mount Saopha) in Pyin Oo Lwin. In this version, they are portrayed not as princes but as orphaned Shan brothers who were adopted by a kind-hearted crown prince of a Shan State. When the brothers came of age, the reigning saopha grew anxious that his son, the crown prince, might join them in a rebellion and threaten his rule. To prevent this, the saopha devised a scheme: he promised to abdicate the throne if the crown prince executed Hkuncho and Hkuntha and presented their heads to him. The crown prince obeyed, killing the two brothers and delivering their heads to his father. However, the saopha then had his son executed as well and took his head. The three severed heads were placed on the mountain as defensive mounds. According to tradition, the fortifications still visible on the mountaintop today were built upon the heads of Hkuncho, Hkuntha, and the crown prince. Because of this tale, the site became associated with the saopha, and the mountain has since been known as Mount Saopha.
