= Loi Wengwo =

- Location within Myanmar

Highest point
- Elevation: 1,831 m (6,007 ft)
- Listing: List of mountains in Burma
- Coordinates: 21°17′29″N 98°56′54″E

Geography
- Location: Shan State, Myanmar
- Parent range: Shan Hills

Climbing
- First ascent: unknown
- Easiest route: climb

Loi Wengwo is a mountain of the Shan Hills, in Shan State, Burma.

== Geography ==
Loi Wengwo is located about 6 km to the west of Mong Ping in Mong Ping Township of Mongsat District, overlooking the valley.

== See also ==
- List of mountains in Burma
