= Ma Ngwe Taung =

Burmese deity

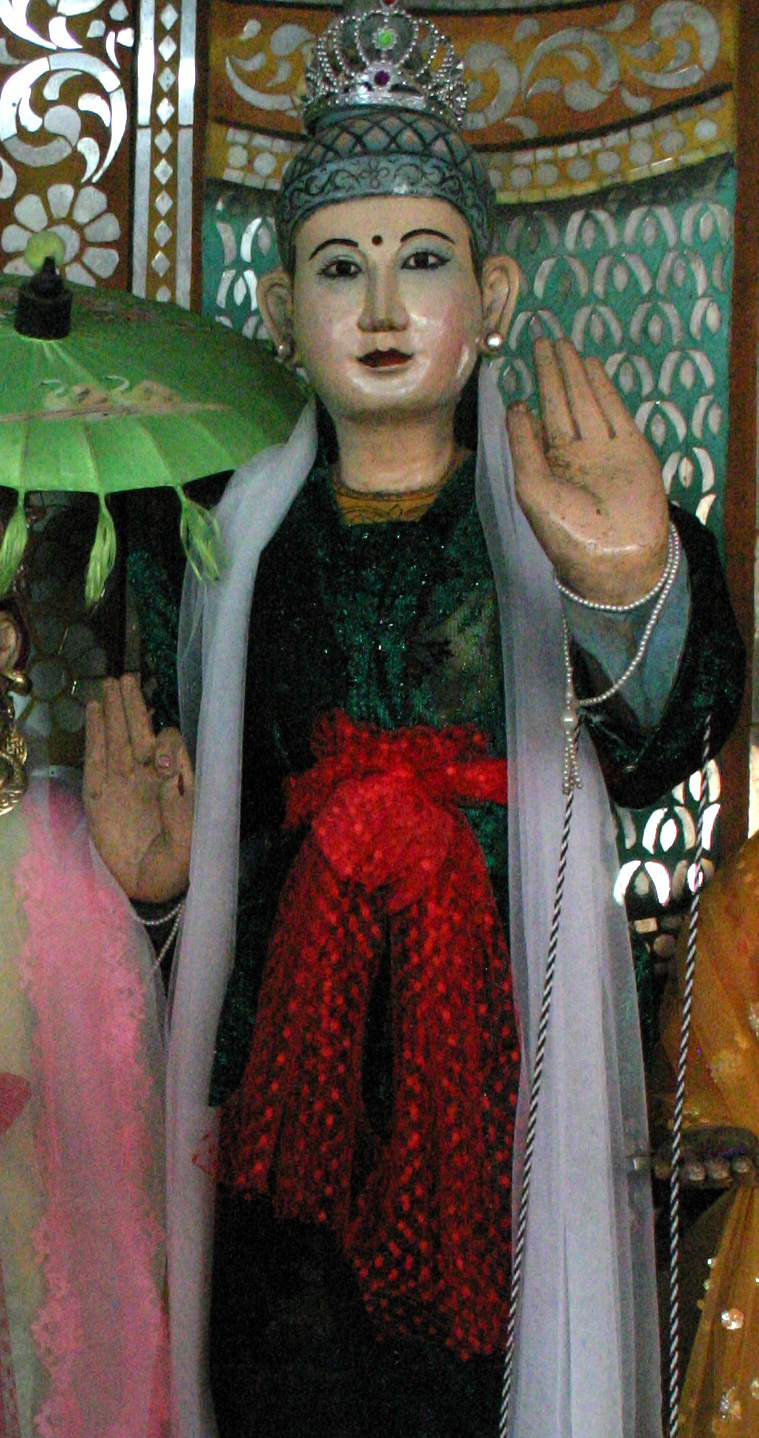
Statue of Ma Ngwe Taung at a shrine in Mount Popa.

Ma Ngwe Taung (Burmese: မငွေတောင်) is a Burmese nat. She is the spirit of a Hindu woman of Burmese Indian descent, who died near Monywa. An annual festival is held every year in her honor. As Ngwe Taung was a Hindu, beef offerings were forbidden.

Taung was seduced by Min Kyawzwa when they were both humans and abandoned. She pined for him so much that her brother, who did not approve of Min Kyawzwa, became angry and pushed her off a cliff. She helps women abandoned by husbands or lovers. She is said to be able to settle family problems.
