= Mong Khet Township =

Mong Khet Township ၸႄႈဝဵင်းမိူင်းၶၢၵ်ႇ မိုင်းခတ်မြို့နယ်
- Township
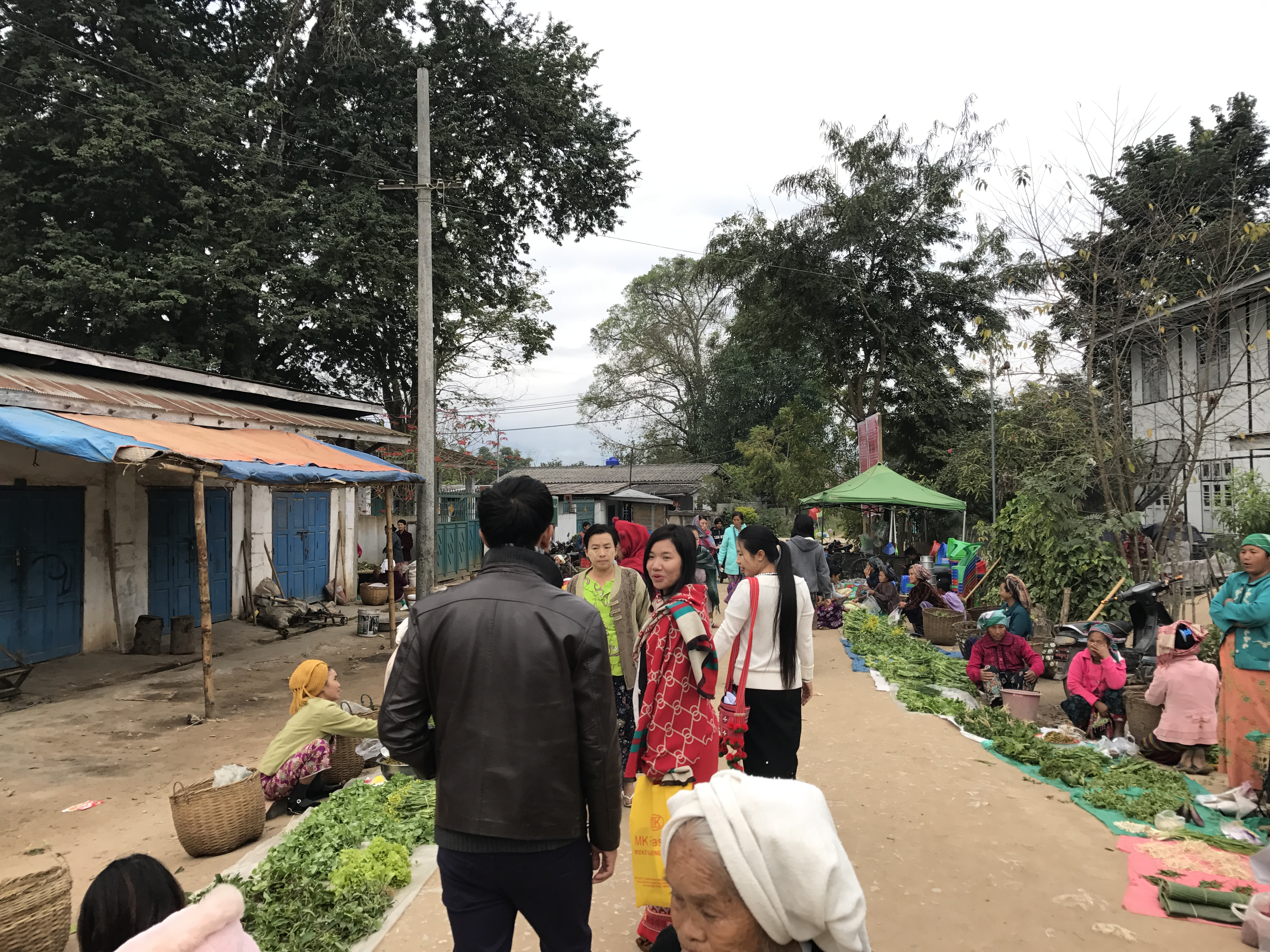

- Location in Kengtung district
- Coordinates: 21°42′00″N 99°23′00″E
- Country: Myanmar
- State: Shan State
- District: Kengtong District
- Capital: Mong Khet

Area
  - Total: 2,513 km^{2} (970 sq mi)
- Elevation: 1,022 m (3,353 ft)

Population (2014)
  - Total: 44,528
  - Density: 17.718/km^{2} (45.89/sq mi)
- Time zone: UTC+6.30 (MST)

Mong Khet Township (also Mongkhat Township, Shan: ၸႄႈဝဵင်းမိူင်းၶၢၵ်ႇ) is a township of Kengtong District in the Shan State of Myanmar. The principal town and administrative center is Mong Khet. In 2015, Mong Khet was calculated to be the center of the Valeriepieris circle, a figure drawn on the Earth's surface such that the majority of the human population lives within its interior.

== Communities ==
Among the many small towns and villages, in addition to the town of Mong Khet, the following communities are local centers: Wan Namtawnkang, Wan La, Wan Singpyin, Wan Hsi-hsaw, Wan Pang-yao, Wan Ho-hkü, Wan Kawnhawng, Wan Ho-nawng, and Ta-pom.

== Valeriepieris circle ==
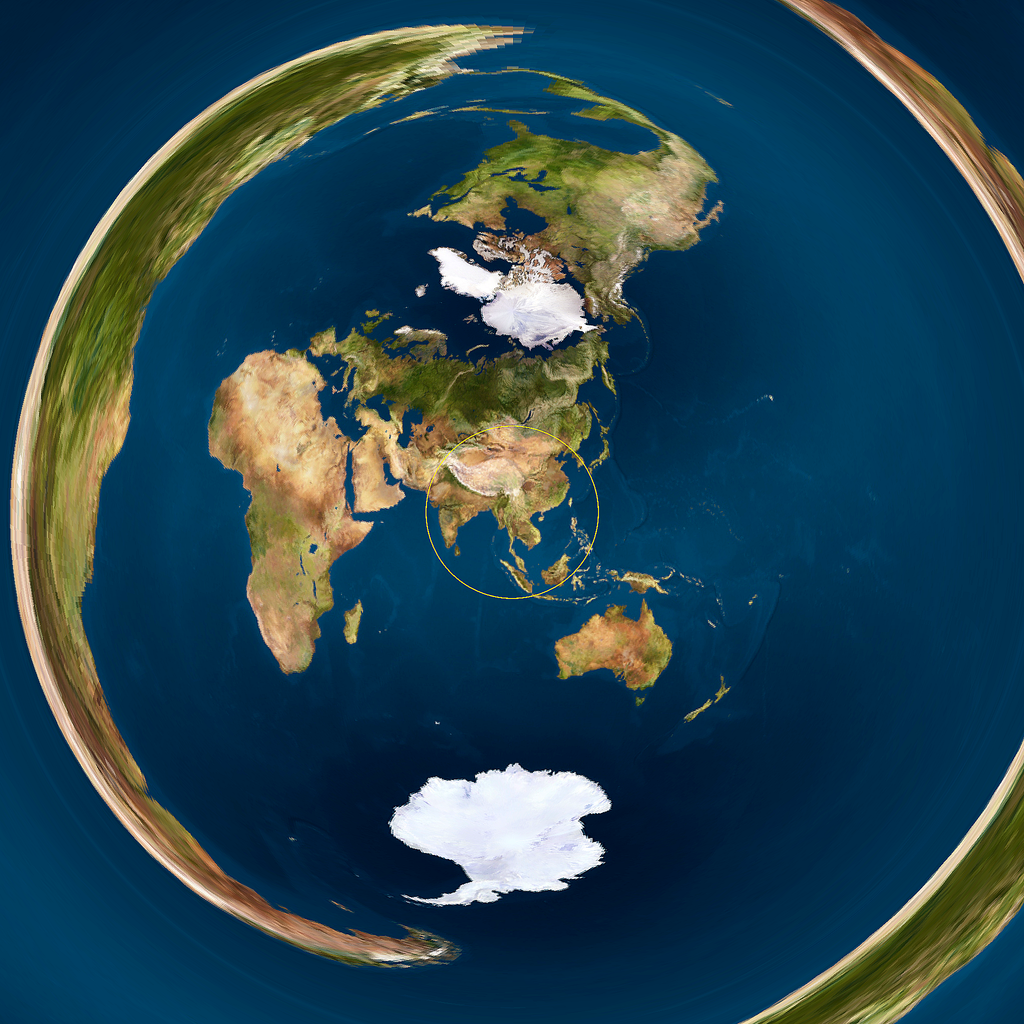

Quah's version of the Valeriepieris circle (yellow) centred on Mong Khet in an azimuthal equidistant projection

The Valeriepieris circle is circle drawn on the earth that contains more humans within it than outside of it. The original circle of 8,000 km (5,000 mi) diameter was originally devised by Ken Myers in 2013, before being later refined to 6,600 kilometers (4,100 mi) by Singaporean economics professor Danny Quah, with Mong Khet identified as the epicentre. The Myers circle was further formalised in 2025 and generalised to other applications.
