= Mong Ping =

Mong Ping မိူင်းပဵင်း Mong Pyin
- Town
- Location in Burma
- Coordinates: 21°21′00″N 99°1′00″E
- Country: Burma
- State: Shan State
- District: Kengtung District
- Township: Mong Ping Township

Area
  - Total: 3.25 sq mi (8.4 km^{2})
- Elevation: 1,535 ft (468 m)

Population (2023)
  - Total: 7,122
- Time zone: UTC+6.30 (MST)

Mong Ping (Burmese: မိုင်းပြင်းမြို့) is a town and seat of Mong Ping Township in Kengtung District, Shan State in eastern Myanmar. The town has 3 wards- Ah Lel Paing, Auk Zay Tan and Ping Sang of which Ping Sang is the most populous with 3,297 people in 2023. The town is not to be confused with the capital of the historical 19th century Mongping State, which in the Lawksawk area.

== Geography ==
Mong Ping lies in a narrow valley about 60 km west of Kengtung. The entirety of the Mong Ping area is mountainous with high ranges running roughly in a north–south direction. The 1,831 m high Loi Wengwo mountain overlooks the narrow Mong Ping valley from the west.
