= Danny Quah =

Professor in economics

- 柯成兴
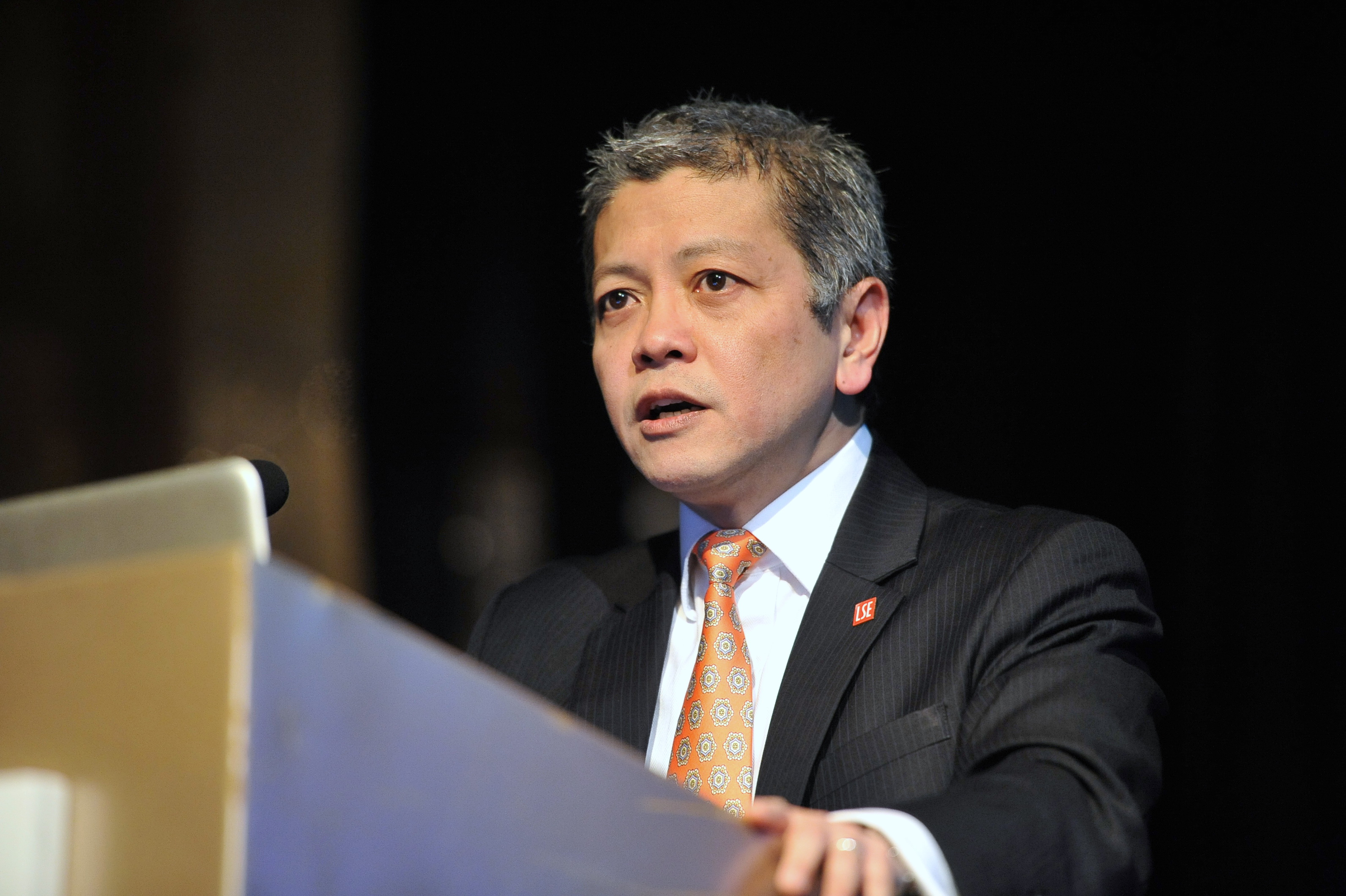
- Danny Quah, University of London KL Lecture, 23 April 2013
- Born: July 26, 1958 (age 68); Penang, Malaya

Academic background
- Education: Princeton University; Harvard University

Academic work
- Discipline: Macroeconomics; Development; International Relations
- Institutions: Lee Kuan Yew School of Public Policy

Chinese name
- Traditional Chinese: 柯成興
- Simplified Chinese: 柯成兴
Transcriptions
Standard Mandarin
- Hanyu Pinyin: Kē Chéngxìng
Yue: Cantonese
- Jyutping: O1 Sing4 Hing3
Southern Min
- Hokkien POJ: Koa Sêng-heng
- Website: Information at IDEAS / RePEc

Danny Quah (Chinese: 柯成兴; pinyin: Kēchéngxìng; Jyutping: O1 Sing4 Hing3; Pe̍h-ōe-jī: Koa Sêng-heng) is Professor in Economics at the Lee Kuan Yew School of Public Policy, National University of Singapore. His work includes contributions to the fields of economic growth, development economics, monetary economics, macroeconometrics, and the weightless economy. Quah is best known for his research on estimation techniques for disentangling the effects of different disturbances on economies, for his studies on economic growth and convergence across nation states, and for his analyses of large-scale shifts in the global economy. After spending several decades as an academic at the London School of Economics, Quah became the dean of the Lee Kuan Yew School of Public Policy, beginning his term on 1 May 2018.

== Early years ==
Quah was born in Penang, in the Federation of Malaya which later became Malaysia, and attended the Penang Free School and Francis Light School before leaving for university studies in the United States. Quah obtained his A.B. from Princeton University in 1980 and his Ph.D. from Harvard University.

== Career ==
Quah worked as assistant professor of economics at MIT before joining the Economics Department at LSE in 1991. Quah was, for 2006–2009, Head of the Economics Department at the London School of Economics and Political Science. He was, through 2016, Professor of Economics and International Development, and founding Director of the Saw Swee Hock Southeast Asia Centre at LSE. Quah joined the Lee Kuan Yew School of Public Policy at NUS as Li Ka Shing Professor in Economics in August 2016.

Quah had served previously as Council Member on Malaysia's National Economic Advisory Council and as Consultant for the Bank of England, the World Bank, and the Monetary Authority of Singapore. Currently, he is on the advisory board of OMFIF where he is regularly involved in meetings regarding the financial and monetary system. Quah had also worked as a visiting assistant professor of economics at Harvard University, a visiting Professor of Economics at Tsinghua University School of Economics and Management and at the Nanyang Technological University of Singapore, and the Tan Chin Tuan Visiting Professor at NUS's Department of Economics.

== Research contributions ==
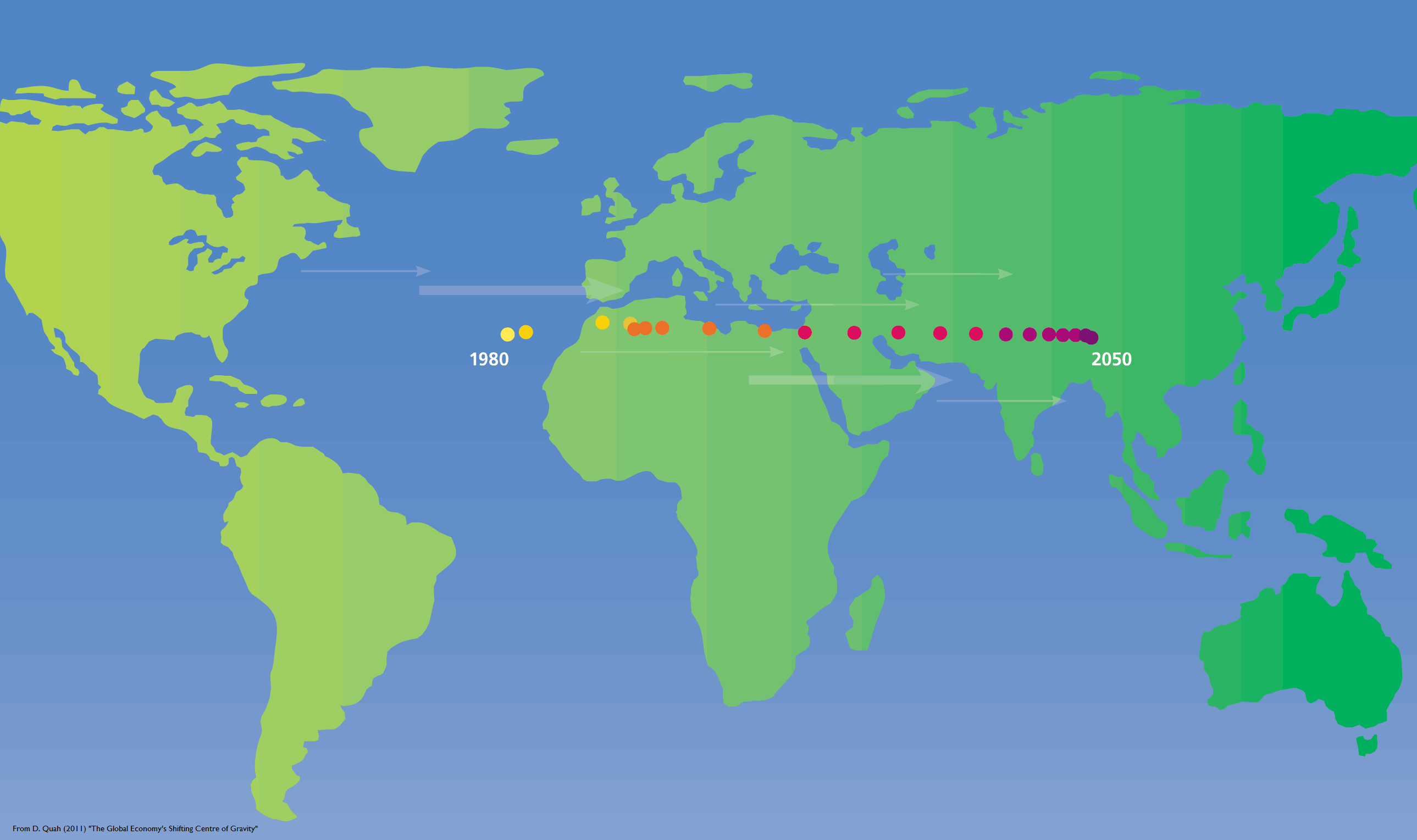
The World's Economic Centre of Gravity 1980–2050. Produced by Quah, 2011.

Google Scholar Citations reports that Quah's most-cited works include his 1989 paper on Vector Autoregressions with Olivier Blanchard and his papers on poverty traps in cross-country economic growth and the convergence of Twin Peaked income distributions. His published academic writings range widely from his prize-winning 2011 paper on the shifting global economy—mapping the eastwards movement in the world's economic center of gravity away from its 1980s mid-Atlantic location—to work while still a graduate student on the appendix to the famous Monetarist paper "Some Unpleasant Monetarist Arithmetic" (by Thomas Sargent and Neil Wallace). Quah calls The Great Shift East the move in the world's economic center of gravity out of the mid-Atlantic location where it had been for most of the 19th and 20th centuries, pulled by the rise of economies in the east. Between 1980 and 2010 that economic center of gravity moved 5,000 km east, to the Persian Gulf, on a trajectory that continues to take it towards the boundary between India and China.

Although the early part of his career saw close attention to technical developments in timeseries econometrics, Quah became heavily influenced by the approach to communicating ideas exemplified in the work of Edward Tufte, and sought similar dissemination of his research to a wider audience. He has also argued that research on economic development needs to be inextricably linked to scholarly work in International Relations.

== Public dissemination ==
Quah's TED talks include "Global Tensions From a Rising East" (March 2012) and "Economics, Democracy, and the New World Order" (August 2014). Quah's public lectures and events, more generally, are available on a curated YouTube listing.

== Valeriepieris circle ==
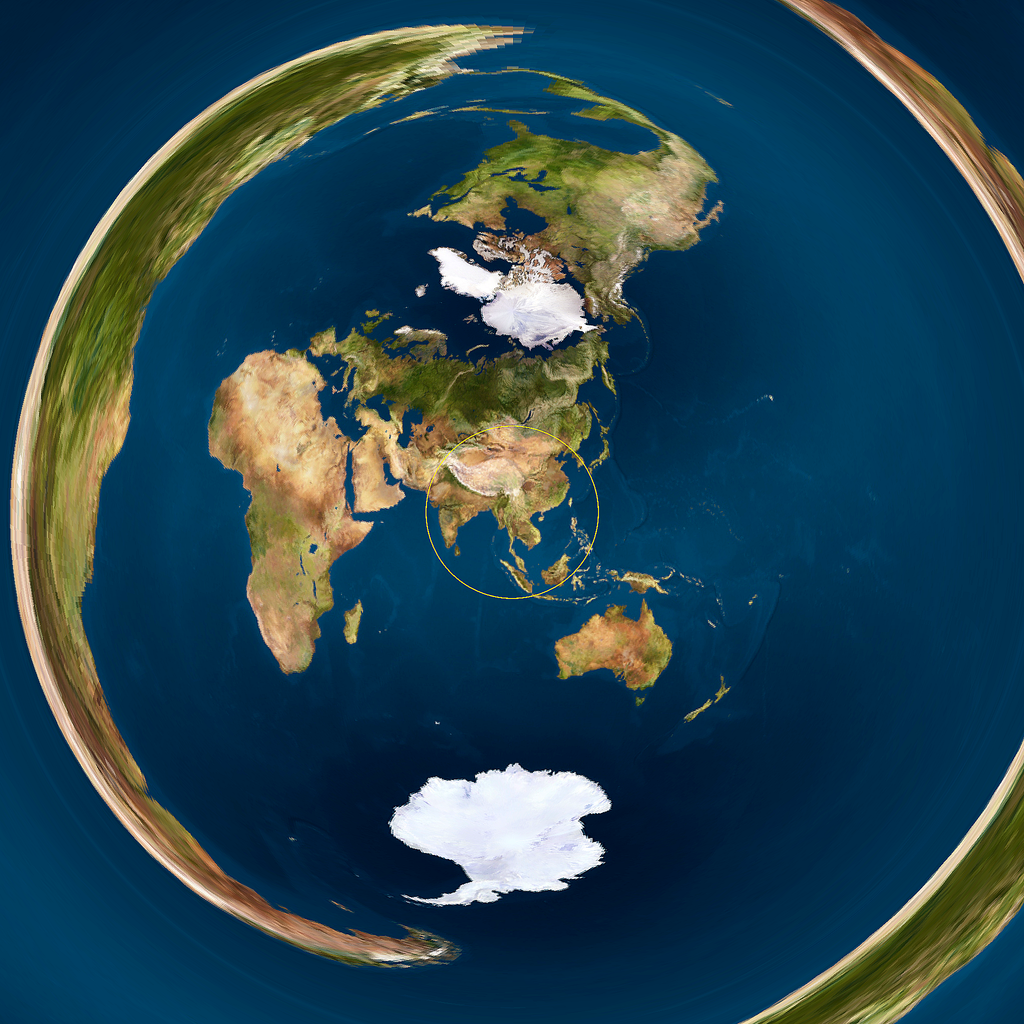

Quah's version of the Valeriepieris circle (yellow) centred on Mong Khet in an azimuthal equidistant projection

The Mong Khet Circle is a 6,600-kilometre (4,100 mi) diameter circle that contains more humans within it than outside of it, and placed over east Asia with its epicenter at Mong Khet Township, Myanmar. An original circle of 8,000 km (5,000 mi) diameter was originally devised by Ken Myers in 2013, before being later refined to 6,600 km (4,100 mi) by Quah, with Mong Khet being identified as the centre.

== Papers ==
- Quah's publications at LSE Research Online

== Personal life ==
Quah has two sons, Carter and Mason.
