= Pandaung Township =

Padaung Township ပန်းတောင်းမြို့နယ်
- Township
- Location in Pyay district
- Coordinates: 18.724°N 95.069°E
- Country: Myanmar
- Region: Bago Region
- District: Pyay District
- Capital: Pandaung

Population (2019)
  - Total: 152,496
- Time zone: UTC+6.30 (MMT)

Pandaung Township (Burmese: ပန်းတောင်းမြို့နယ်; officially Padaung Township) is a township in Pyay District in the Bago Region of Myanmar. The township contains two towns- the principal town Pandaung and its largest town Ushitpin- with a total of 8 urban wards. In 2019, Pandaung had 7,973 people and Ushitpin had 11,107 people. The township also contains 210 villages grouped into 41 village tracts.
