= Valeriepieris circle =

Circle on Earth's surface enclosing majority of the human population

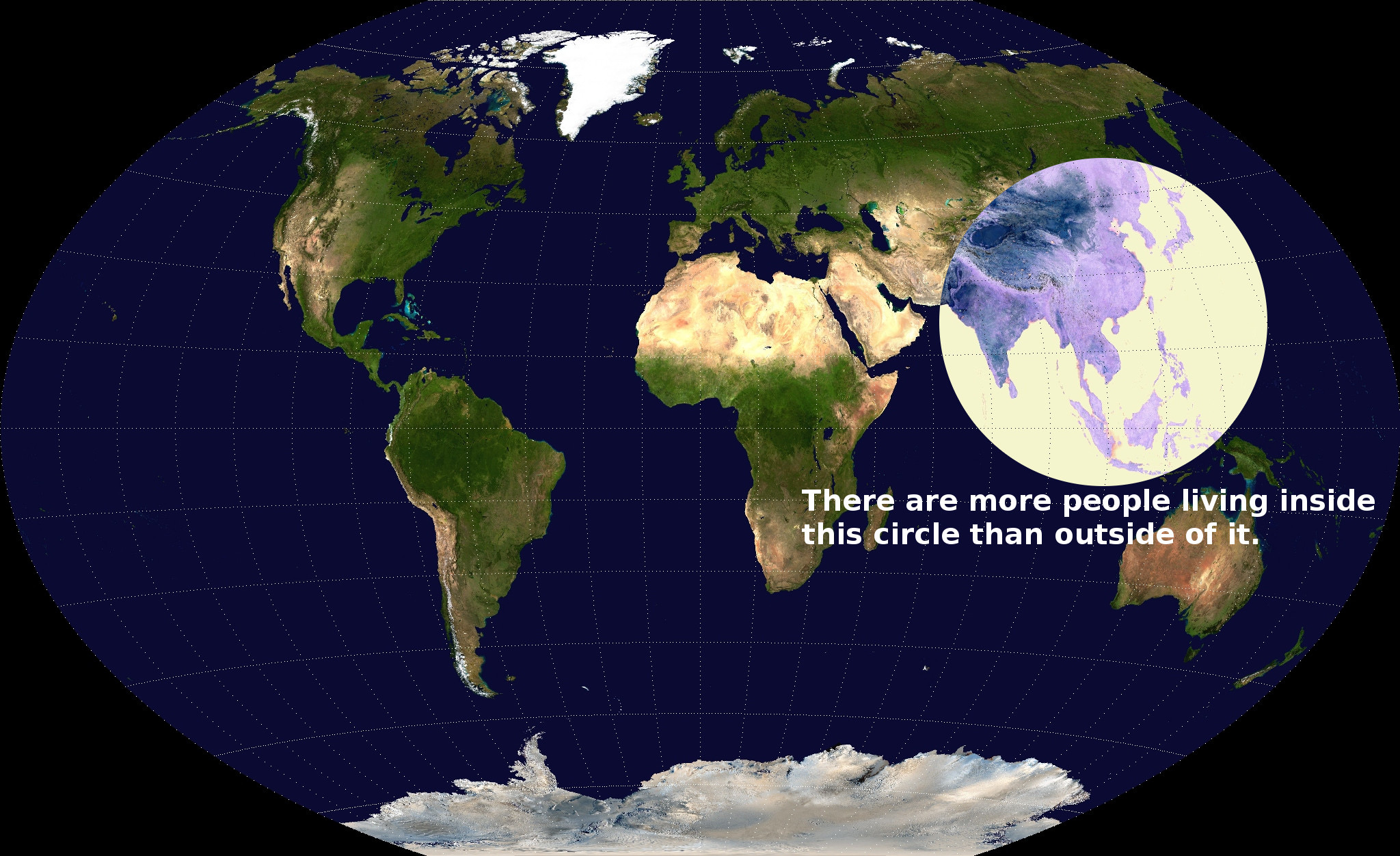
The original 2013 map by Ken Myers, with the interior of the circle inverted

A Valeriepieris circle (/ˌvæləriːˈpaɪrəs/ VAL-ə-ree-PY-rəs) is a figure drawn on the Earth's surface such that the majority of the human population lives within its interior. The concept was originally popularized by a map posted on Reddit in 2013, made by an American ESL teacher named Ken Myers, whose username on the site gave the figure its name. Myers's original circle covers only about 10% of the Earth's total surface area, with a radius of around 4,000 kilometers (2,500 miles), centered in the South China Sea and covers more than half of Asia, including some of the world's most populous countries. The map became a popular meme, and was featured in numerous internet media outlets.

Myers's original map uses the Winkel tripel projection, which means that his circle, not having been adjusted to the projection, does not correspond to a circle on the surface of a sphere.

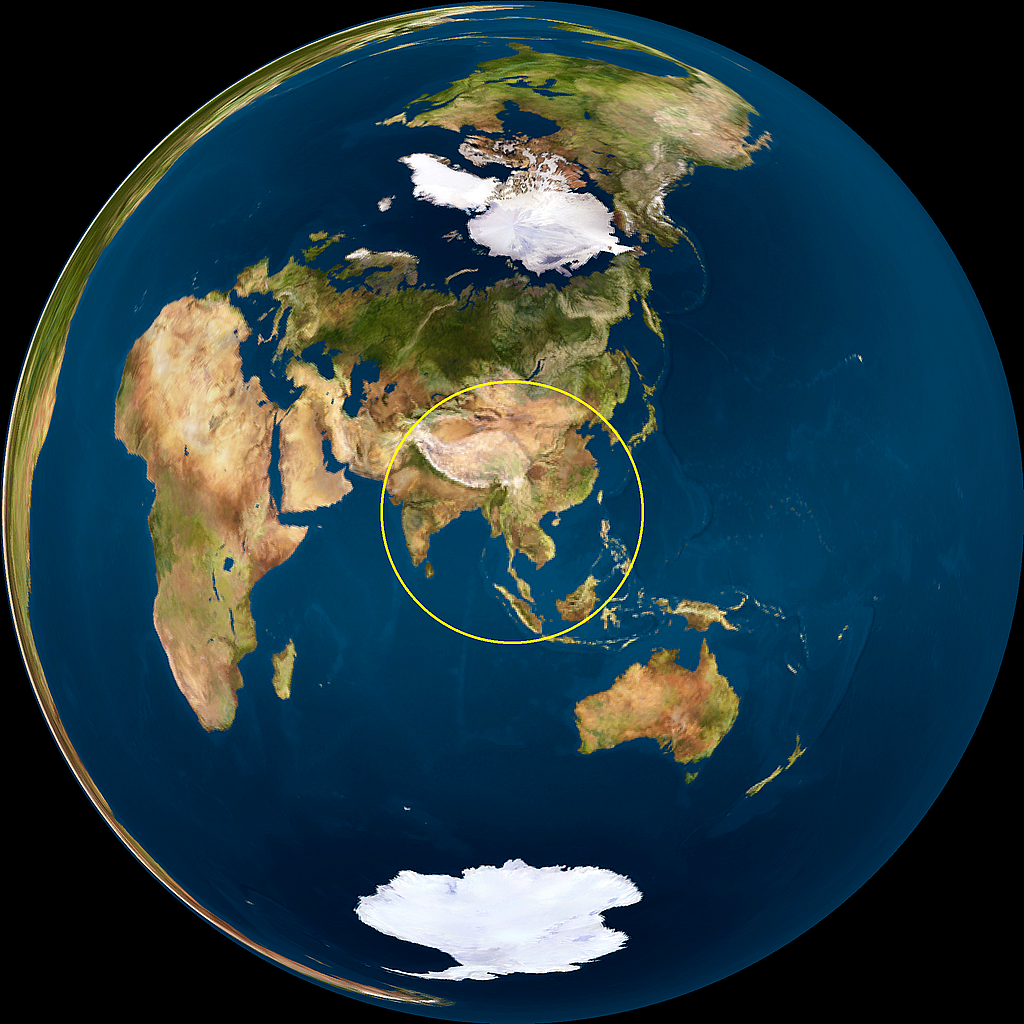
Danny Quah's 2015 circle, on a Lambert azimuthal equal-area projection – the fraction of the area of the circle to that of the globe is equal to its equivalent on Earth

In 2015, Singaporean professor Danny Quah verified Myers's original claim, as well as presenting a new, considerably smaller circle centered on the township of Mong Khet in Myanmar, with a radius of 3,300 kilometers (2,050 mi). In fact, Quah claimed this circle to be the smallest one possible, having been produced from more rigorous calculations and updated data, as well as being a proper circle on the Earth's surface.

In 2022, Myers's original circle was again tested by Riaz Shah, a professor at Hult International Business School. Shah used recently published data from the United Nations' World Population Prospects to estimate that 4.2 billion people lived inside the circle as of 2022, out of a total human population of 8 billion. Mapmaker Alasdair Rae proposed The Yuxi Circle, after reviewing 1,500 circles (148 of which had 4 billion or more inhabitants), claiming that the city of Yuxi in Yunnan province, China has the largest population living within a 4,000 km radius: 4.32 billion (55% of the world population at the moment).

The smaller Valeriepieris circle is densely populated, containing almost all of China, India, Borneo and the Philippines; large parts of Indonesia, Pakistan and Korea; and the entirety of Taiwan, Nepal, Bangladesh, Sri Lanka and Mainland Southeast Asia.

Myers's idea has been formalized and a Valeriepieris circle can be defined for any spatial area, like a single country. These generalized circles can be used for studying population changes over time, dimensional reduction and measuring population centralization.
