= Taung Kalat =

Buddhist temple complex in Myanmar

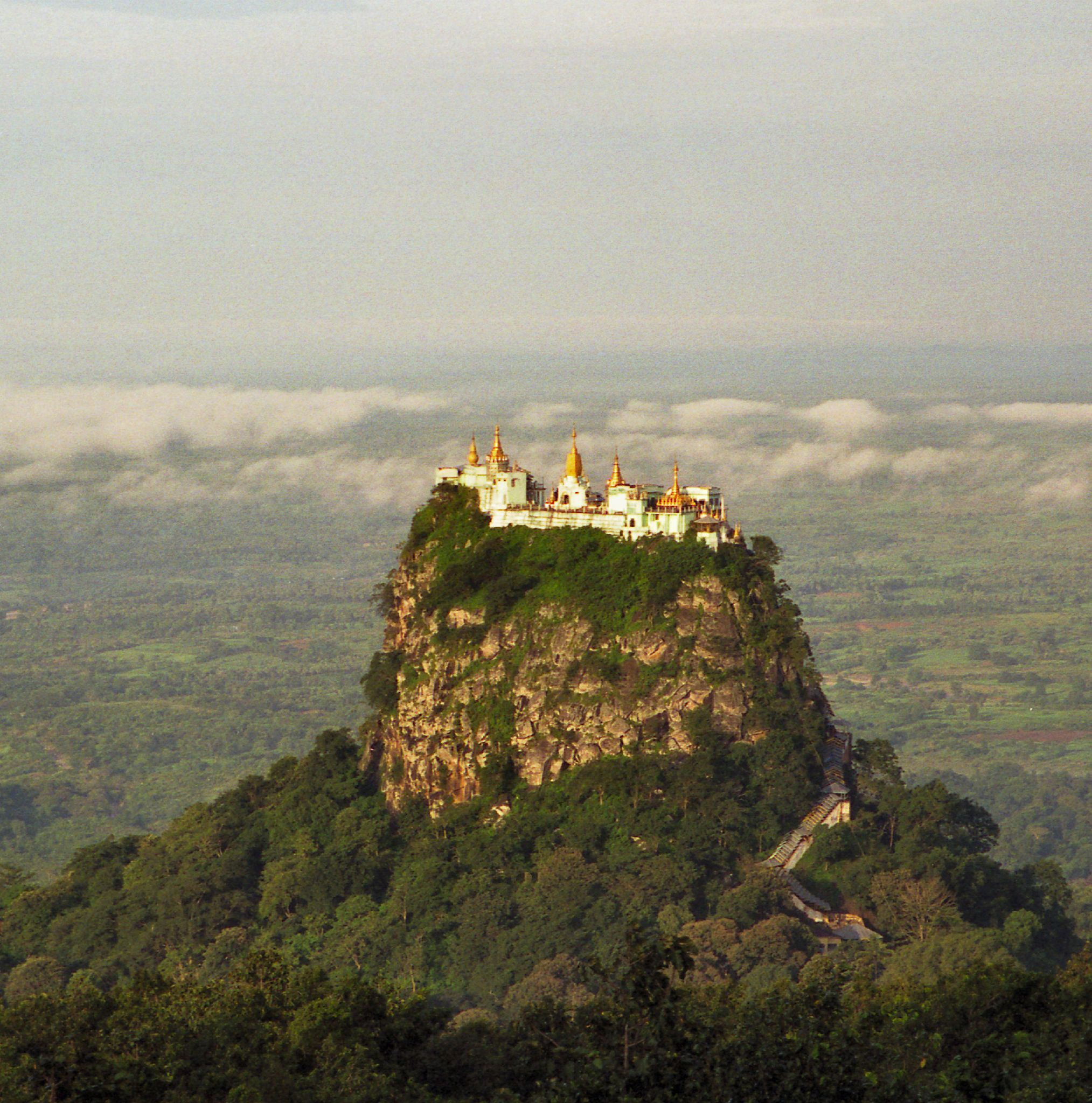

Religion
- Affiliation: Buddhism
- Status: active

Location
- Location: Mandalay Region, Myanmar
- Country: Myanmar
- Interactive map of Taung Kalat
- Coordinates: 20°55′46.6″N 95°12′30.7″E

Taung Kalat (Burmese: ပုပ္ပါးတောင်ကလပ်) is a Buddhist monastery and temple complex located on Mount Popa in Mandalay Region, Myanmar. The site is built on a tall volcanic plug, and is one of several prominent nat spiritual sites in the vicinity of Mount Popa.

== Description ==
The temple complex sits on top of a 225-metre-tall (737 ft) volcanic plug; this rock formation resulted from geologic activity around Mount Popa, an inactive volcano. The site is a popular pilgrimage destination, and is considered a source of nat spiritual energy. The 777 steps leading up to the monastery were once maintained by U Khandi, a famous Burmese hermit.
