= Wan Singpyin =

Mong Khat Mong Khat
- Location in Burma
- Coordinates: 21°44′21″N 99°27′36″E
- Country: Burma (Myanmar)
- Division: Shan State
- Districts: Kengtong
- Township: Mong Khet

Population
  - Religions: Buddhism
- Time zone: UTC+6.30 (MST)
- WOEID: 1017965

Mong Khat Township (also(Approved)" Mong Khat) is a town in Kengtong District of Shan State of Myanmar. The town is located alongside the Nam Loi Creek, a tributary of the Mekong. The nearest airport is 51 miles away in Kengtong.
