= Lawksawk State =

Former Shan state in Burma

Coordinates: 21°14′N 96°52′E

Lawksawk (Yatsawk) ရပ်စောက်နယ်
- State of the Shan States
- 1630–1959
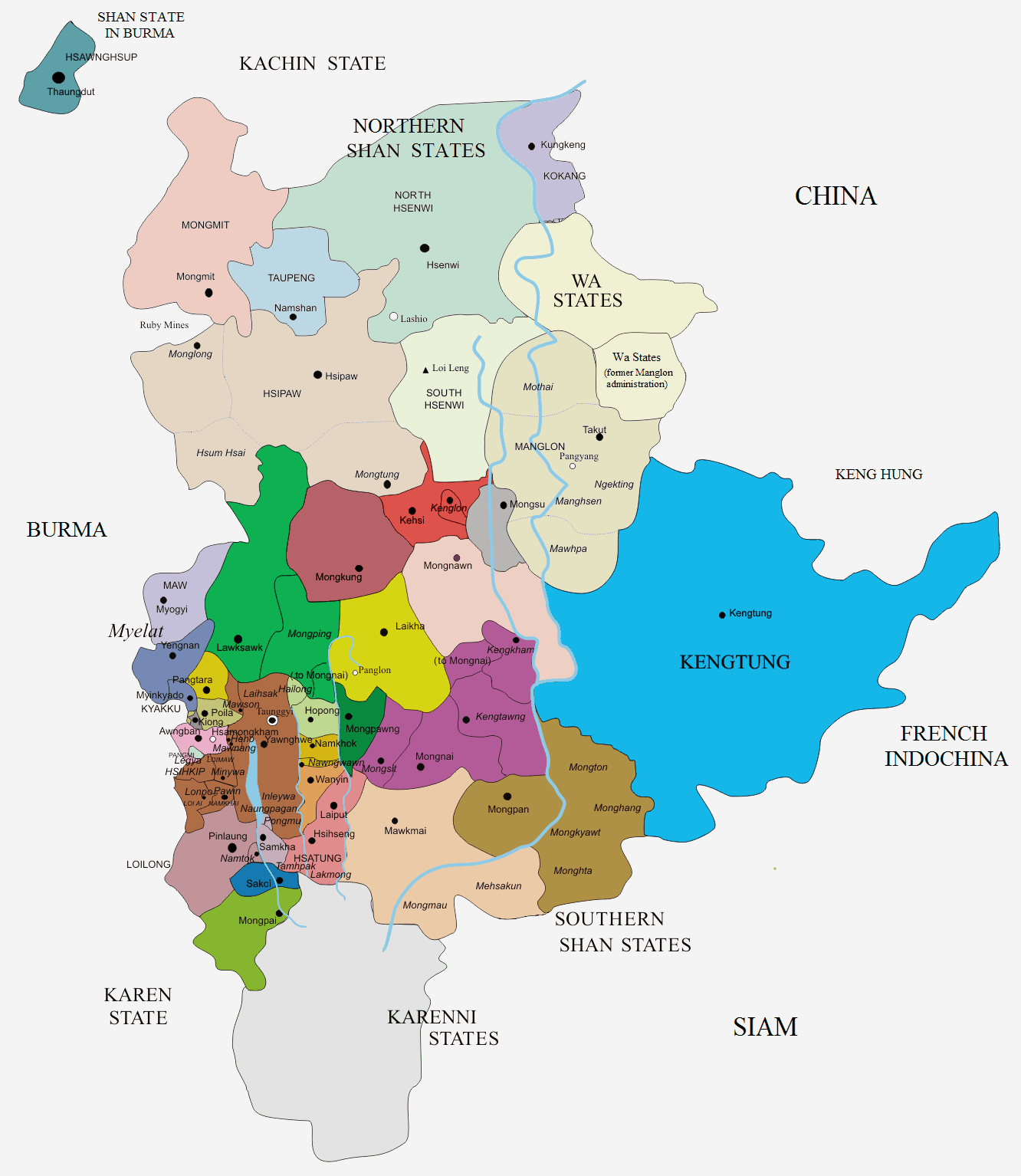
- Lawksawk State in a map of the Shan States
- Capital: Lawksawk
- Area
  - 1901: 3,537 km^{2} (1,366 sq mi)
- Population
  - 1901: 24,839
- History
  - State founded: 1630
  - Abdication of the last Saopha: 1959
Succeeded by
Shan State

Lawksawk, also known as Yatsawk (Burmese: ရပ်စောက်) was a Shan state in what is today Burma. It was located north of Myelat and belonged to the Central Division of the Southern Shan States. Its capital was Lawksawk town. The state included 397 villages and the population was mostly Shan, but there were also Danu, Pa-O and Palaung people in the area.

== History ==
Lawksawk State was founded in 1630. According to tradition a predecessor state named Rathawadi had existed previously in the area. Between 1881 and 1886 the state was attacked and occupied by Yawnghwe.

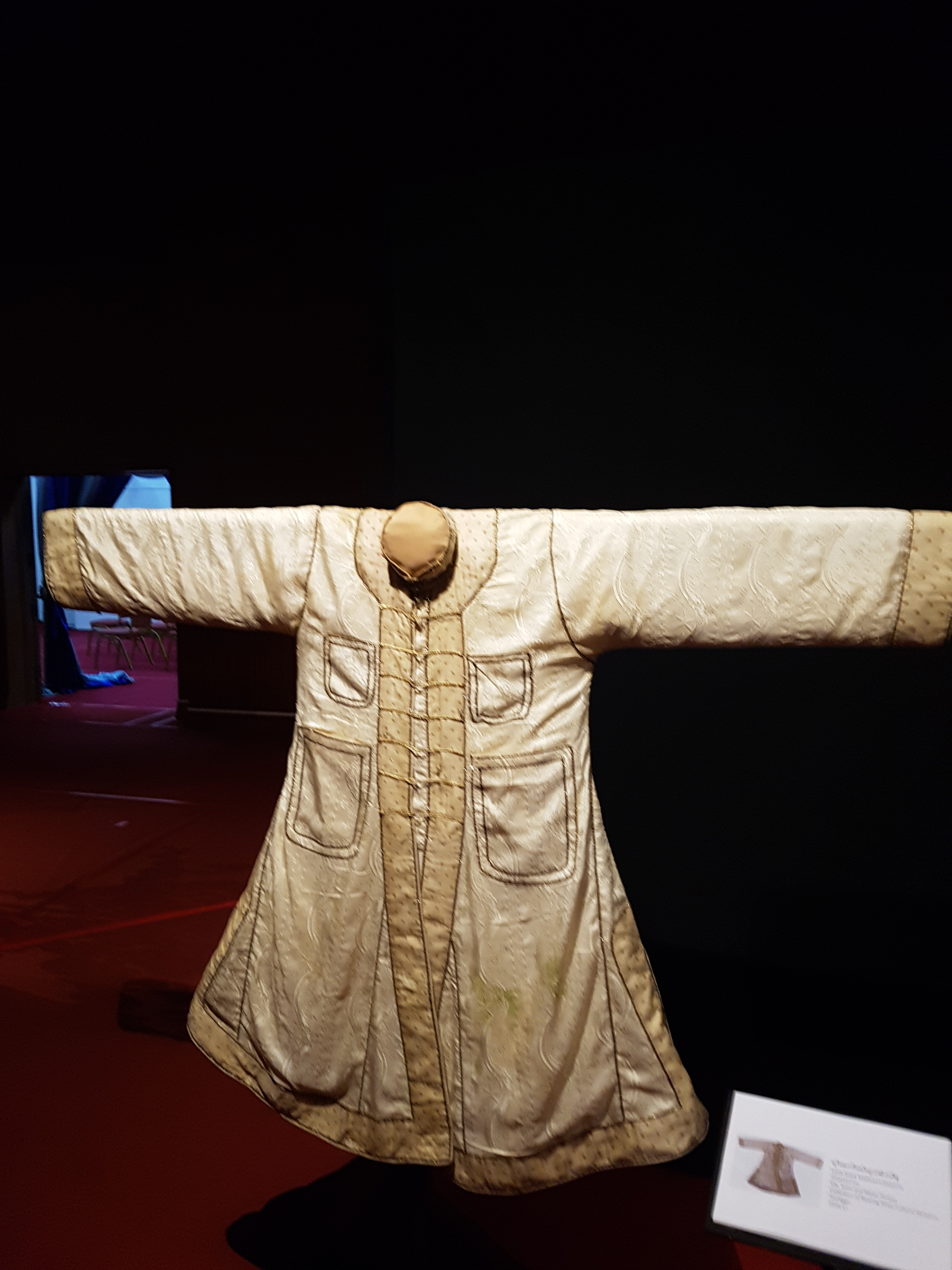
Ceremonial Robe of the Saopha of Lawksawk, created in Yawnghwe around the year 1900

Lawksawk included the substate of Mongping (Möngping), located in the southeastern part and separated from Lawksawk State proper by the Nam Et River.

=== Rulers (title Saopha) ===
Ritual style Kambawsa Rahta Maha Thiriwuntha Thudama.

Saophas :

- 1450 - 1475 Hkun Tai Phong
- 1475 - 1497 Hkun Tai Hkom
- 1497 - 1507 Hkun Hta Hkar
- 1507 - 1524 Hso Kyeng Hpa
- 1524 - 1536 Hso Kyaw Hpa
- 1536 - 1546 Hso Kaan Hpa
- 1546 - 1555 Hso Khaing Hpa
- 1555 - 1566 Hso Hom Hpa
- 1566 - 1580 Hso Won Hpa
- 1580 - 1610 Hso Hon Hpa
- 1610 - 1630 Hso Haw Hpa
- 1630 - 1660 Hso Kyen Hpa
- 1660 - 1675 Hso Waing Hpa from Hsipaw state
- 1675 - 1680 Vacant
- 1680 - 1707 Sao Fai Hkam
- 1707 - 1729 Hkun Hkam Kyaw
- 1729 - 1753 Hkun Hkam Hta
- 1753 - July 1760 Hta Pan Möng
- 1760 - 1763 Sao Möng Ai
- 1763 - July 1790 Sao Hkam Yi
- 1790 - 1791 Vacant
- 1791 - 1792 Sao Möng Kywet
- 1792 - 1811 Hkun Sam Lik
- 1811 - 1812 Vacant
- May 1812 - 1813 Sao Oun Kyaing -Regent
- 1813 - 1850 Hkun Hkam Aye
- 1850 - Dec 1854 Vacant
- 1854 - 1856 Hkun Long Hpa (d. 1856) from Laihka
- Dec 1856 - 1881 Hso Waing Hpa (1st time)
- 1881 - 1886 Sao Sai Pin
- 1886 - Jan 1887 Hso Waing Hpa (2nd time)
- Jan 1887 - Oct 1887 Ai Lao Hkam from Bo Saing -Regent
- 9 Oct 1887 - 1900 Hkun Noum (b. 18.. - d. 1900)
- 1900 - 1946 Sao Hkun Serk (b. 1863 - d. 1946)
- 1946 - 1958 Sao Hkun Sa (b. 1895)
