= Ko Thein Shin =

Burmese deity

Ko Thein Shin (Burmese: ကိုးသိန်းရှင်; lit. 'Lord of the Nine Conquer' or 'Lord of the 900,000') is a Burmese nat (deity) and the guardian spirit of the Kyaukse Nine Agricultural Districts. Before attaining godhood, he was the Saopha of Maw, and the brother of the queens Saw Mon Hla, Sao Aung, and Sao Nang. Ko Thein Shin's legend is sometimes conflated with that of Ko Myo Shin, another nat and the guardian spirit of the Bago Region. This has caused confusion in many scholarly accounts, with the two legends occasionally being merged.

== Legend ==
According to legend, Ko Thein Shin was Sao Khun Naung (also spelt Saw Kaw Mong), the Saopha of Maw during the reign of King Anawrahta of Pagan around 740. He was the brother of Saw Mon Hla, one of Anawrahta's principal queens. One day, after dismissing Saw Mon Hla from the court, Anawrahta felt sorrow for his actions and marched to Maw. By the time he arrived, Saw Mon Hla and her father had already died, and her brother Sao Khun Naung had succeeded as the new ruler of Maw. After Anawrahta explained himself and admitted his wrongdoing, Sao Khun Naung welcomed him and offered his two younger sisters Sao Aung and Sao Nang to Anawrahta as tribute.

His two sisters died in Kyaukse, sacrificing themselves so that the Zeedaw Dam on the Zawgyi River, which had failed many times, could finally be built. Prophets had told King Anawrahta that the dam would only succeed if a sacred royal lady was offered. So, Sao Aung sacrificed herself for the people and the kingdom, and her younger sister followed her in the sacrifice. When Sao Khun Naung heard the news of his sisters' deaths, he went to Kyaukse and, heartbroken, jumped into the Zawgyi River, becoming a nat.

The three siblings then appeared before King Anawrahta and asked for a divine place as apaing-za to live. Anawrahta granted them the Kyaukse Nine Agricultural Districts as their spiritual domain and ordered the people in those districts to worship them as guardian deities. Sao Aung was given control over the upper dam of Zeedaw, and Sao Nang over the lower dam.

== Worship ==
His main shrine is located at the Zeedaw Dam in Kyaukse, in addition to other shrines across the Nine Agricultural Districts and in Shan State. In the Kyaukse Nine Agricultural Districts, locals believe that on the 9th day of the waxing moon and the 9th day of the waning moon, nine people should never travel together. If they do, it is thought that misfortune or calamity will follow. To avoid this, travelers in these districts traditionally refrain from moving in groups of nine. To avert bad luck when nine people must travel together, locals pick up a small stone and symbolically add it as a tenth companion, calling it "Maung Kyauk Ke" (မောင်ကျောက်ခဲ, lit. 'Brother Stone').
