= Mong Ping Township =

Mong Ping မိုင်းပျဉ်းမြို့နယ် Mong Pyin
- Township
- Location in Kengtung district
- Coordinates: 21°21′00″N 99°1′00″E
- Country: Myanmar
- State: Shan State
- District: Kengtung District
- Capital: Mong Ping

Area
  - Total: 2,331.87 sq mi (6,039.5 km^{2})
- Elevation: 1,535 ft (468 m)

Population (2023)
  - Total: 63,161
- Time zone: UTC+6.30 (MMT)

Mong Ping Township (Burmese: မိုင်းပျဉ်းမြို့နယ်, officially Mong Pyin Township) is a township of Kengtung District in the Shan State of Myanmar. The township has 2 towns- the capital town Mong Ping with 3 urban wards and Tontar with 4 urban wards. The township also has 393 villages grouped into 24 village tracts. The township has one subtownship, Tontar Subtownship, an unofficial subdivision used for administrative and statistical purposes. The township was formerly part of Mong Hsat District.
