= Lawksawk =

Lawksawk လွၵ်ႉၸွၵ်ႇ Yatsawk
- Town
- Location in Burma
- Coordinates: 21°14′45″N 96°52′0″E
- Country: Myanmar
- Division: Shan State
- District: Taunggyi
- Township: Lawksawk

Population
  - Religions: Buddhism
- Time zone: UTC+6.30 (MST)

Lawksawk (Shan: လွၵ်ႉၸွၵ်ႇ), also known as Yatsauk (Burmese: ရပ်စောက်; also spelt Yatsawk), is a town in Shan State, Myanmar. It is the capital town and administrative center of Lawksawk Township. The town is located along an oxbow lake of the Zawgyi River at an altitude of 910 metres (2,990 ft). Lawksawk is about 48 kilometres (30 mi) north of Taunggyi, or 70 kilometres (43 mi) by road on National Route 43. It was the historical capital of Lawksawk State. The town is near Bahtoo Station, a major military base.

== Transport ==
Since 1998, Lawksawk has been served by a branch of the Myanmar Railways network that runs from Aungban.
