= Möng Ping State =

Former Shan State in Burma

Coordinates: 21°2′N 97°6′E

Möng Ping
- State of the Shan States
- 17th century–1842
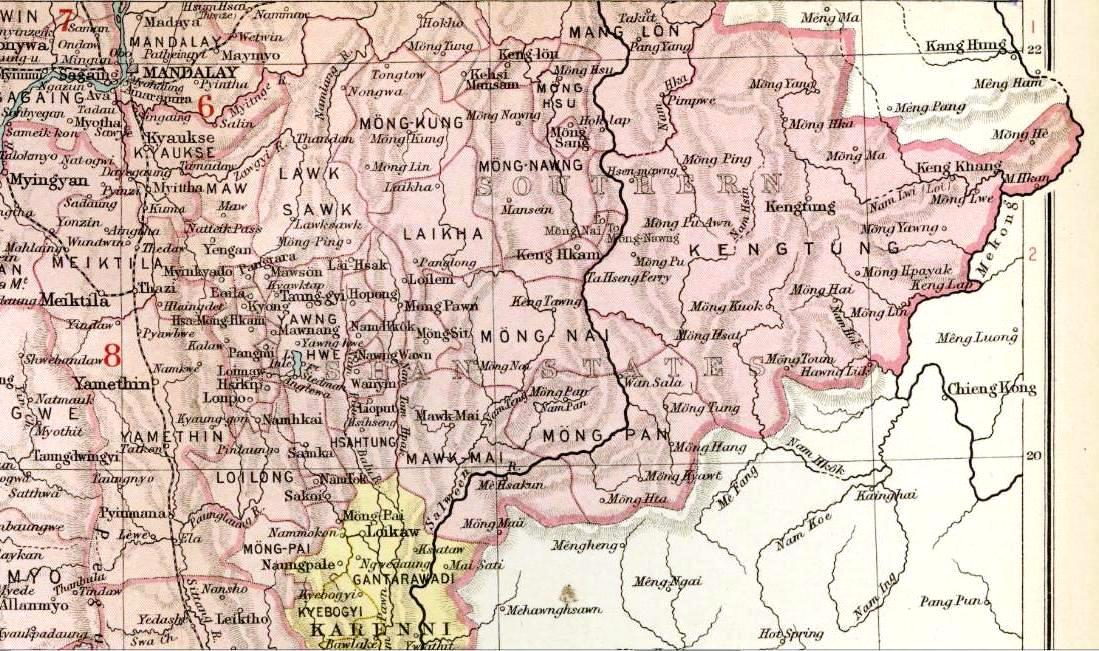
- Möng Ping in an Imperial Gazetteer of India map
- Capital: Möng Ping (near Lawksawk)
- History
  - Founded as vassal state of Lawksawk: 17th century
  - Annexed by Lawksawk: 1842
Succeeded by
Lawksawk State

Möng Ping (Burmese: Maingpyin) was the smallest state of the Shan States in what is today Burma.

== History ==
Little is known about the history of this state except that in 1842 it was merged with Lawksawk. It was located at the southeastern end of that state, separated from it by the Nam Et River.

=== Rulers ===
- 1835 - 1842 Hkam Hlaing
- 1842 - .... Hkam Kaw
