= Kengtung District =

Kengtung District ကျိုင်းတုံခရိုင် Kyaingtong District
- District
- Kengtung District in Shan State
- Coordinates: 21°35′00″N 99°35′00″E
- Country: Myanmar
- State: Shan State
- Capital: Kengtong

Area
  - Total: 10,688 km^{2} (4,127 sq mi)
- Elevation: 807 m (2,648 ft)

Population (2014)
  - Total: 366,861
  - Density: 34.325/km^{2} (88.90/sq mi)
- Time zone: UTC+6:30 (MMT)

Kengtung District (Burmese: ကျိုင်းတုံခရိုင်, also spelled Kengtong or Kyaingtong), is a district in eastern Shan State in Myanmar. It consists of three townships.

== Townships ==
townships in Langkho district Kengtung Mongkhet Mongping

The district contains the following townships:

- Kengtung Township, Kengtung is the largest, most mountainous, most easterly, and culturally the furthest from the Burmese, of all the Shan States. Geography makes approach to it from the rest of Burma difficult for it lies not only beyond the Salween across which no bridge has been built and whose eastern tributaries have cut no easy routes through the serried north-south ranges, but nearer again to the Mekong than to the Salween.
- Mong Khet Township
- Mong Ping Township
  - Tontar Subtownship

Prior to 2022, the District also included Mong Yang Township and Mong La Township. Additionally, Mong Ping Township was not part of the district. In April 2022, the Ministry of Home Affairs reorganised the district, splitting Mong Yang and Mong La into their own districts and transferring Mong Ping Township into the district, splitting it off from Mong Hsat District.

The authority of Matman (Maman) Township transferred from Kengtung District to Hopang District after September 2011.
