= Min Kyawzwa =

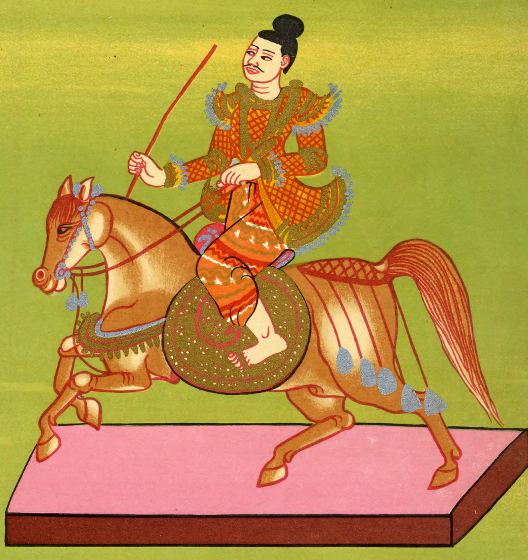
Min Kyawzwa Nat depicted on a brown horse

Offerings of alcohol and liquor to U Min Kyawzwa.

Min Kyawzwa (Burmese: မင်းကျော်စွာ, pronounced [mɪ́ɰ̃ tɕɔ̀zwà]; also known as U Min Gyaw and Ko Gyi Kyaw), is one of the 37 nats in the official pantheon of Burmese nats. He is a composite representation of multiple historical personalities. One version puts him as a son of King Theinhko of Pagan; he was murdered by his brother. Another version puts him as an adviser to King Alaungsithu of Pagan; he died an alcoholic. Another puts him as Crown Prince Minye Kyawswa of Ava, who fell in action in the Forty Years' War. Yet another version puts him as a son of the Lord of Pyay and Kuni Devi. He reportedly was a "drunkard and cock fighter and also a good rider", killed by his victims Hkuncho and Hkuntha, who turned nats.

Ma Ngwe Taung, another nat, was seduced by Min Kyawzwa when they were both humans and abandoned by him. She pined for him so much that her brother, who did not approve of Min Kyawzwa, became angry and pushed her off a cliff. She helps women abandoned by husbands or lovers.

Min Kyawzwa is the guardian of drunkards and gamblers, and grants wealth to those he favours. His main shrine is in his hometown of Pakhan, near Pakokku in Magway Region, where his festival is held every March.
