= Pandaung =

Town in Bago Region, Myanmar

Padaung ပန်းတောင်းမြို့
- Town
- Location in Myanmar
- Coordinates: 18.715491°N 95.144862°E
- Country: Myanmar
- Region: Bago Region
- District: Pyay District
- Township: Pandaung Township

Area
  - Total: 0.66 sq mi (1.7 km^{2})

Population
  - Total: 7,973
  - Density: 12,000/sq mi (4,700/km^{2})
- Time zone: UTC+6.30 (MMT)

Pandaung (Burmese: ပန်းတောင်း, officially romanised as Padaung) is the capital of Pandaung Township in western Bago Region, Myanmar.

== History ==
Pandaung's recorded history stretches back to the Bagan Kingdom when Sithu IV's son Thihathu of Prome fled to Pyay and was said to have come across a lime-covered stupa in Pandaung where he prayed for "the Emperor to become a King". In 1287, after Sithu IV became a vassal of the Mongol Empire, Thihathu ambushed and killed his father. On his way back to Pyay, he built another stupa in Pandaung and prayed to the original stupa for forgiveness, asking that his father not be reborn into his own unborn child. The folk etymology of the town's name comes from this story, deriving from a shortening of the phrase ဆုပန်တောင်းပန်, 'Pray for forgiveness' (Su-pan-taung-pan).

In 1415, the governor of Pandaung was captured in a riverine naval battle during the Forty Years' War.

The modern town was created a town from the pre-existing village by the Ministry of Home Affairs in 1972. The town lies on the main road connecting Pyay to Rakhine State and is the namesake of the Taungup-Pandaung road.

== Education ==
The Pandaung primary school was recognised as a "rural model school" by the Ministry of Education with community learning centres funded by various educational organisations from Pyay and Yangon. The learning centres in Pandaung support libraries and social activities for youth and was slated to be a model for rural educational access in Myanmar.
