= Ananda Temple =

Prominent Buddhist temple in Bagan Myanmar

- အာနန္ဒာဘုရား
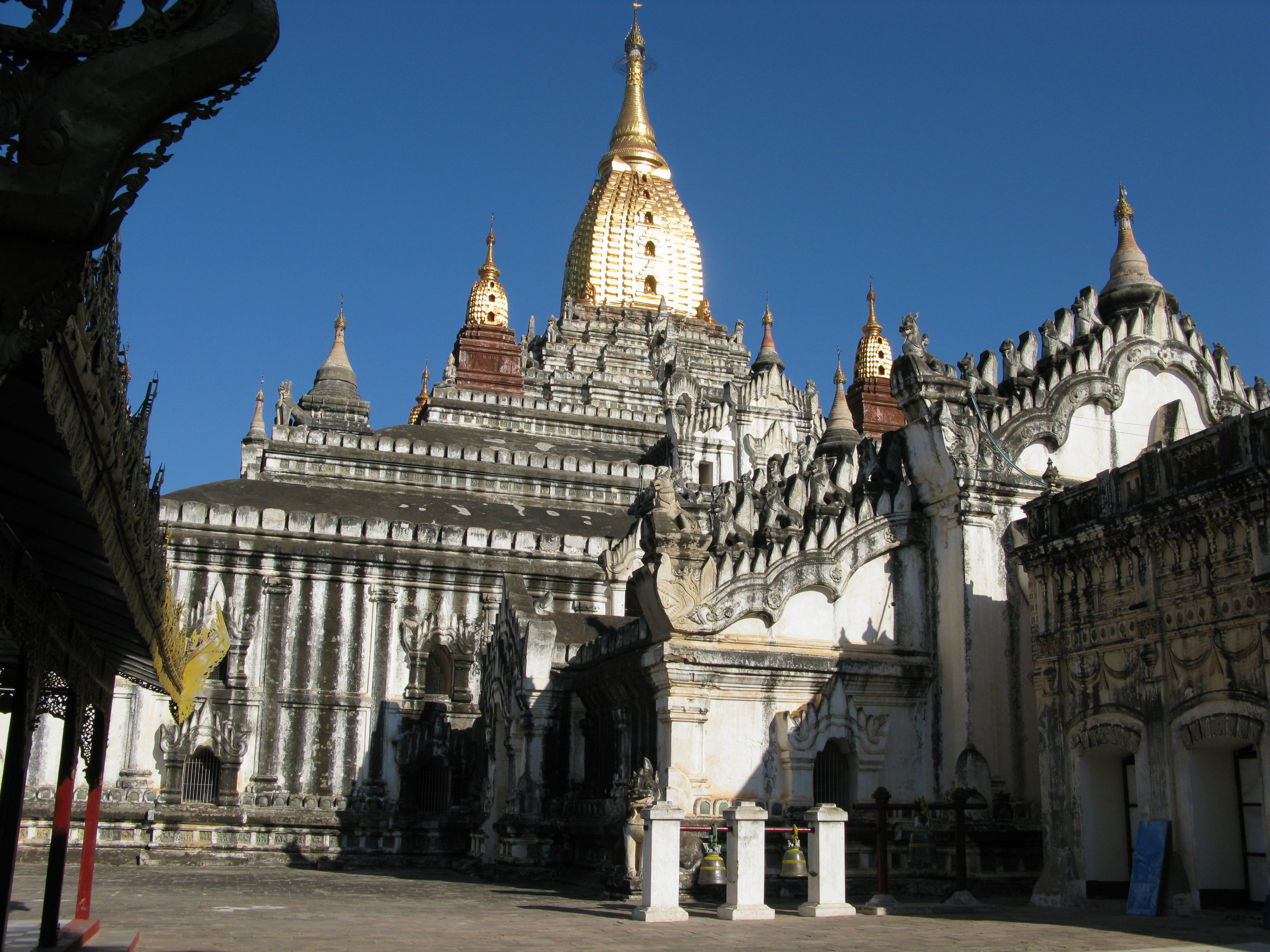
- The front view of Ananda Temple

- Location within Burma

Religion
- Affiliation: Theravada Buddhism

Location
- Location: Bagan, Myanmar
- Country: Myanmar
- Coordinates: 21°10′14.90″N 94°52′04.28″E

Architecture
- Founder: Kyansittha
- Groundbreaking: c. 1090
- Completed: 1105; 921 years ago

Specifications
- Height (max): 51 m (167 ft)
- Spire height: ?

The Ananda Temple (Burmese: အာနန္ဒာ ဘုရား, pronounced [ànàɰ̃dà pʰəjá]), located in Bagan, Myanmar is a Buddhist temple built in 1105 AD during the reign (1084–1112/13) of King Kyansittha (Hti-Hlaing Min) of the Pagan Dynasty. The temple layout is cruciform with several terraces leading to a small pagoda at the top covered by an umbrella known as hti, which is the name of the umbrella or top ornament found in almost all pagodas in Myanmar. The Buddhist temple houses four standing Buddha statues, each one facing the cardinal direction of East, North, West and South. The temple is said to be an architectural wonder in a fusion of Mon and adopted Indian style of architecture. The impressive temple has also been titled the "Westminster Abbey of Burma". The temple has close similarity to the Pathothamya temple of the 10th–11th century, and is also known as “veritable museum of stones”.

The temple was damaged in the earthquake of 1975. However, it has been fully restored and is well maintained by frequent painting and whitewashing of the walls. On the occasion of 900th anniversary of its construction celebrated in 1990, the temple spires were gilded. It is a highly revered temple of Bagan.

== Etymology ==
The name Ananda of the temple is derived from Ananda, Buddha's first cousin, personal secretary, one of his many principal disciples and a devout attendant. It was once known as Ananta Temple, coming from the phrase 'ananta pinya' in Sanskrit, which translates as "endless wisdom". However, the word 'Ānanda' in Pali, Sanskrit as well as other Indian languages mean "bliss". It is a popular Buddhist and Hindu name. The attributes of the Buddha, his infinite wisdom "Anandapinnya in Burmese and Pali" is commemorated in its name 'Ananda'.

== Legend ==
The legend associated with building of this temple ended in tragedy for the builders. Eight (8) monks who approached the King Kyansittha seeking alms gave a graphic description of the Nandamula Cave temple in the Himalayas where they had meditated. When the king invited them to the palace to hear more details, the monks invoked their meditative psychic skills and vividly explained to the King, the landscape of the place they had lived. The King, pleased with this show of their skills, requested the monks to build a temple in the middle of the Bagan plains creating cool conditions in the temple. After the monks completed the temple construction, the King, in order to retain the uniqueness of the temple, got the architects (monks) killed to ensure that another similar structure was not built by them anywhere else. You could see it only in Bagan

George Coedes states a different fate for the architect, "he and a child were buried alive to serve as guardian spirits of the temple."

== History ==
History of this perfectly dimensioned temple structure built in 1105 is credited to King Kyansittha. It denotes "the stylistic end of the Early Bagan period and the beginning of the Middle period". The timing of building this temple is considered as a culmination of religious education that began during the Pahothanya temple building activity in 1080 AD. The Theravada Buddhism adopted by the King motivated him to present the teachings of Buddha to his people in an accurate and a genuine way through the medium of this temple, to unite Burma under one flag and thus "creating mass religious enthusiasm". It has been inferred that the King, as the upholder of the Law wanted to convey his firm belief in the Buddhist doctrine according to his interpretation:

(He) shall purify (and) make straight, write down (and) establish all the holy scriptures. (He) shall proclaim (and) voice the Law, which is even as a resounding drum. (He) shall arouse all the people that are slumbering carelessly. (He) shall stand steadfast in the observance of the commandments at all times.

Through the iconographic depictions (in stone images, the numbered jataka plaques and the standing Buddha images), presented in the symmetrically planned layout of the Ananda temple, King Kyansittha established and conveyed his doctrine to his people in a visual format. The King who founded this temple is associated with Buddhist architecture.

=== Architectural history ===
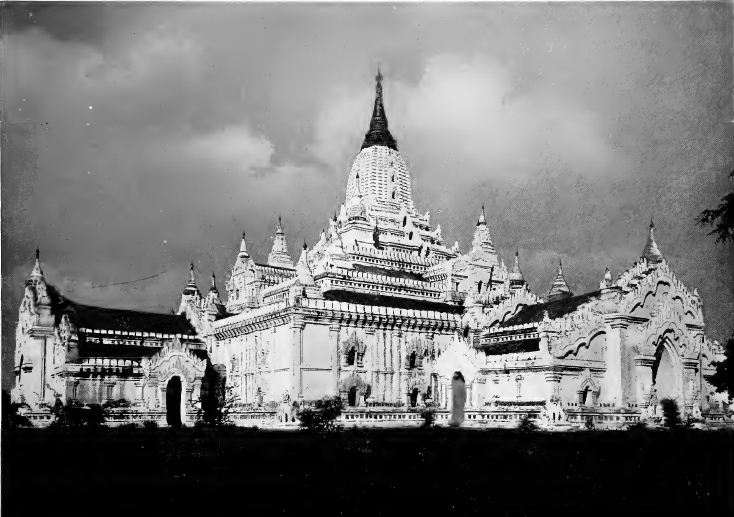
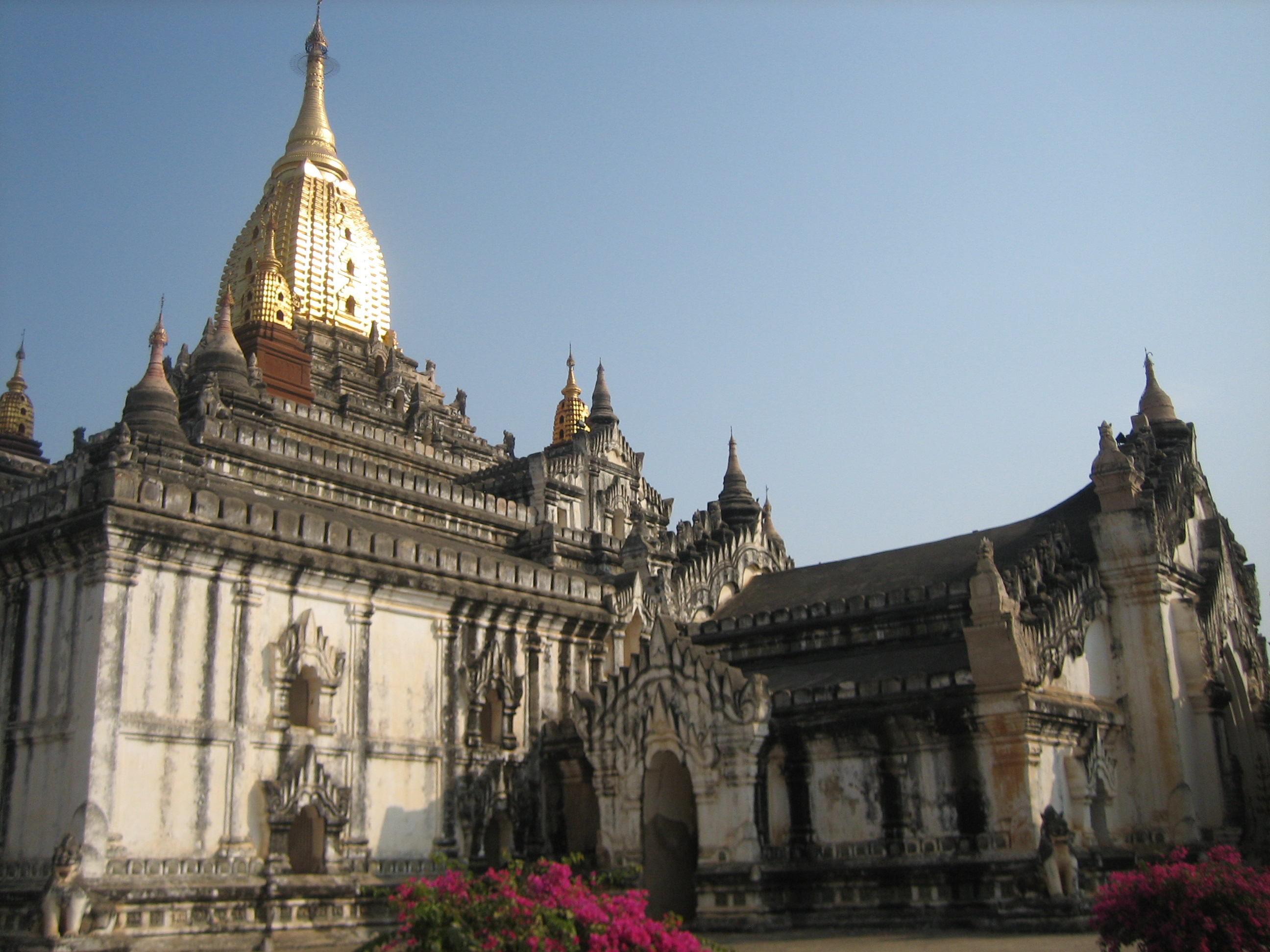
Ananda Temple in 1890s (left) and 2007

The architectural history of the temple has been widely analysed. While the Mon architecture of Burmese origin is noted, strong influence of Indian Architecture from many temples of Bengal and Orissa is very clear. In this regard archaeologist Duroiselle has made these observations: "There can be no doubt that the architects who planned and built the Ananda were Indians. Everything in this temple from shikara to basement, as well as the numerous stone sculptures found in its corridors, and the terra-cotta plaques adorning its basement and terraces, bear the indubitable stamp of Indian genius and craftsmanship...In this sense we may take it, therefore, that the Ananda, though built in the Burmese capital, is an Indian temple." It is also said that the architecture of this temple greatly represents the Ananta cave temple in Udayagiri hills in Odisha.

The temple is being restored with the help of the Indian government.

== Architecture ==
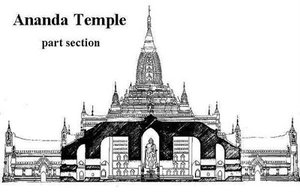

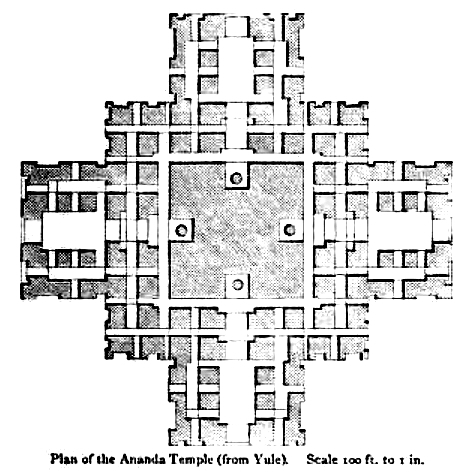
Plan of Ananda Temple

Ananda temple is a perfectly dimensioned stylistic structure, a fusion of Mon and Indian architectural styles and is the central monument built in the Pagan valley. It has been built with bricks and plaster depicting iconographic images in stones and plaques (terra-cotta glazed tiles) with the main purpose of educating the people of the region in the religious ethos of Theravada Buddhism and in accordance with the personal beliefs of the King Kyansittha.

=== Layout ===
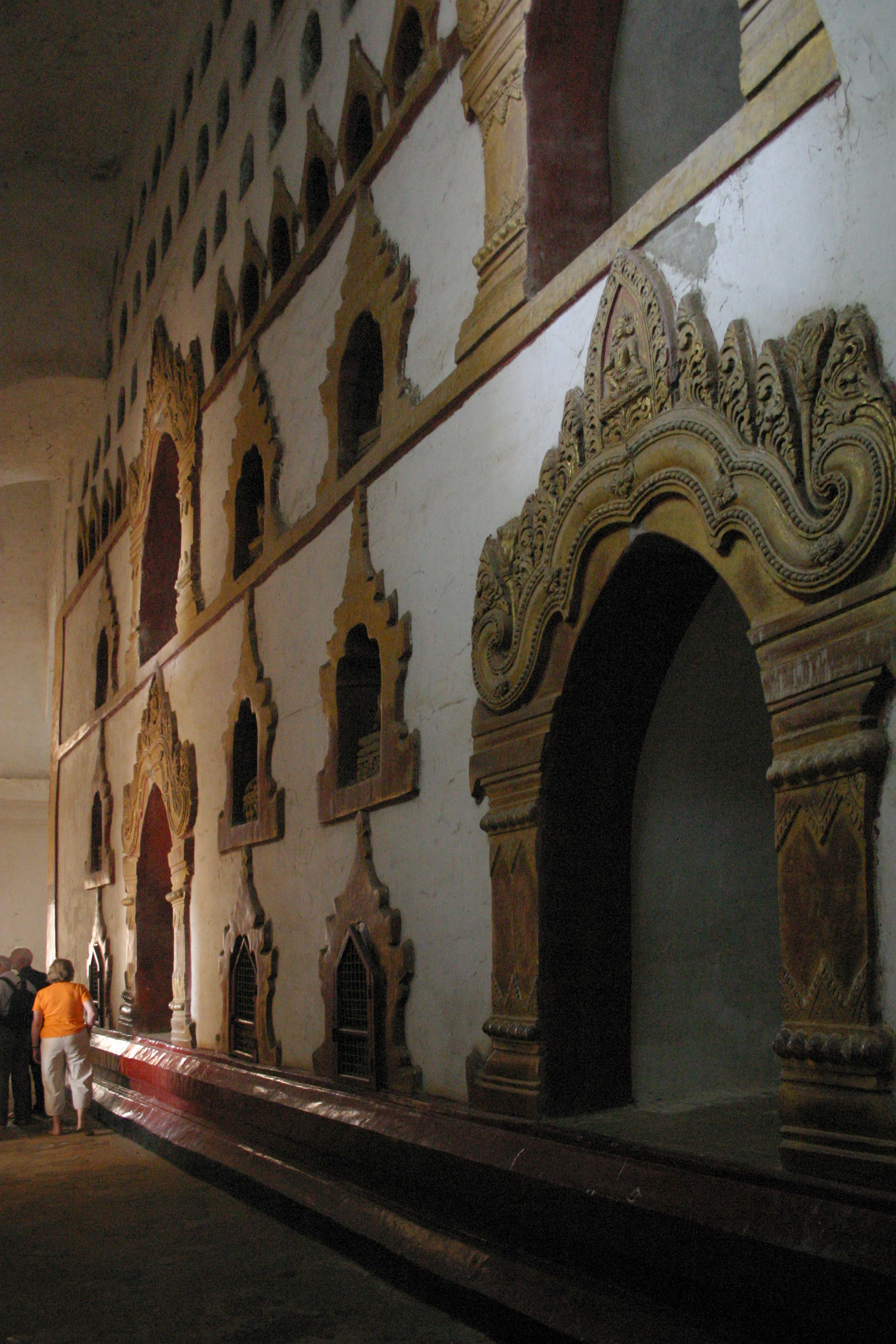
Frescoes of Buddha from birth to death depicted in the passage

The temple structure is in the form of a simple corridor. It has a central square of 53 metres (174 ft); gabled porches project out by 57 feet (17 m) from each face of the square. The superstructure is 51 metres (167 ft) in height formed by decorated terraces. The total length of the temple from end to end is about 290 feet (88 m). In the crucifix layout adopted for the temple, the main plinth over which two receding curvilinear roofs have been built followed by four receding terraces above it. The four terraces lead to the top, where it terminates in a small pagoda and an umbrella known as hti, which is the name of the top ornament found in almost all pagodas in Myanmar. The core part of the temple, at the centre of the terraces, is in the shape of a cube, which houses the four standing Buddha massive statues on its four faces, each of 9.5 metres (31 ft)height (above a 8 feet (2.4 m) high throne). The spire rises above this cubic structure. Two passages delimit the central cube, with the four sides of the cube; each face is decorated with a massive image of the Buddha. The four entrances are provided with teak wood carved doors in the interior and these entrances form a perfect cross or cruciform. A stupa finial crowns each entrance. Jataka scenes (life story of the Buddha – said to be sourced from Mon texts) are embossed over 554 terra cotta tiles that decorate the base, sides and terraces. Each niche, inside the four entrances of the cubical structure, form the sanctum where standing Buddhas, fully gilded and in different mudras or forms are deified and worshipped.

The two circumambulatory passages have vaulted roof. In these inner passages, surrounding the central cubicle, sculptural ornamentation in the form of 80 large reliefs carved out of volcanic rocks, representing Buddha's life from birth to death, are depicted. The two main passages have cross passages also, which provide the link between the porch and the standing images of the Buddha.

The external walls of the temple are 39 feet (12 m) in height. They are adorned with fortified parapet walls. Each corner has a ringed pagoda.

=== Buddhas ===
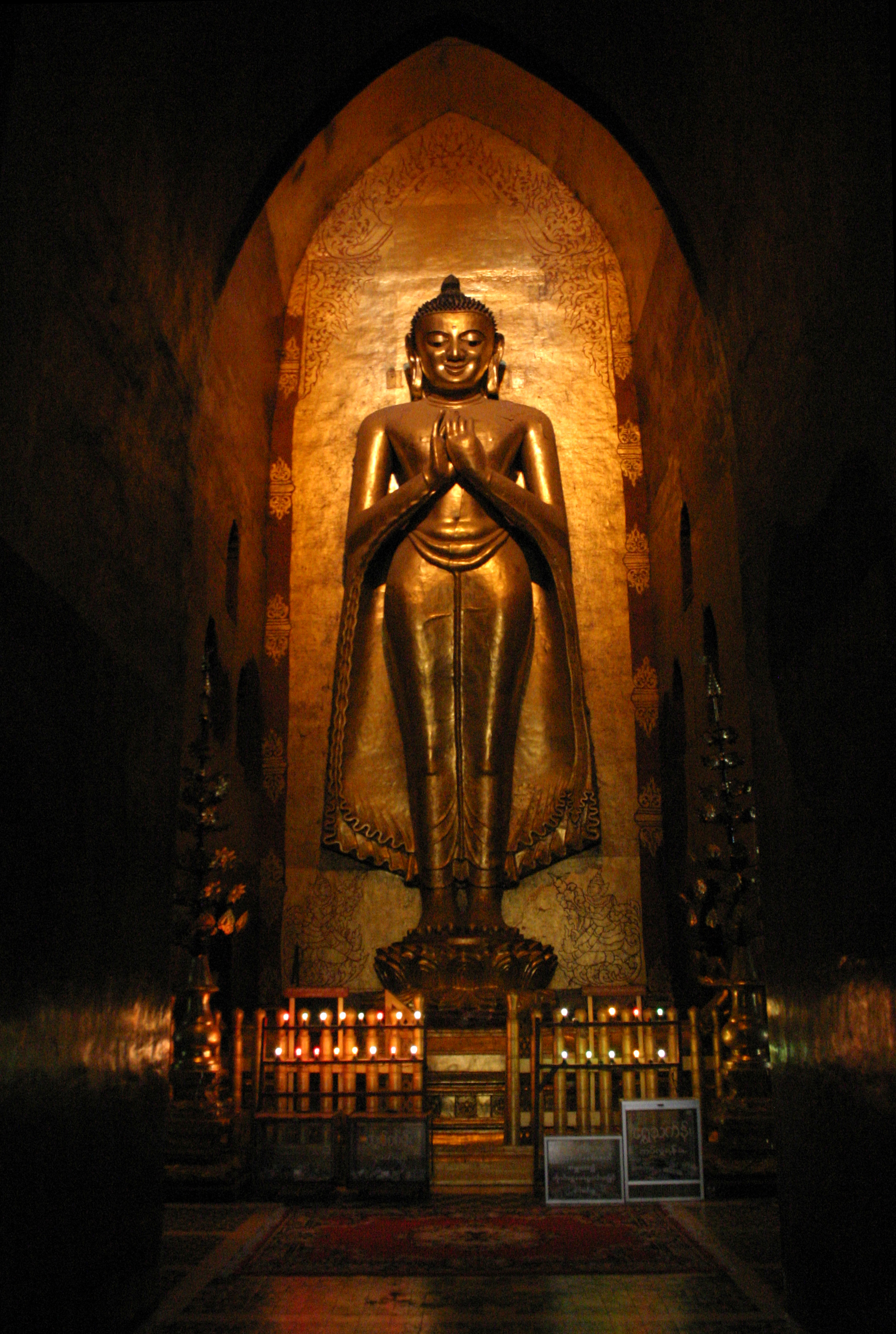
Standing Buddha – Kassapa – South facing

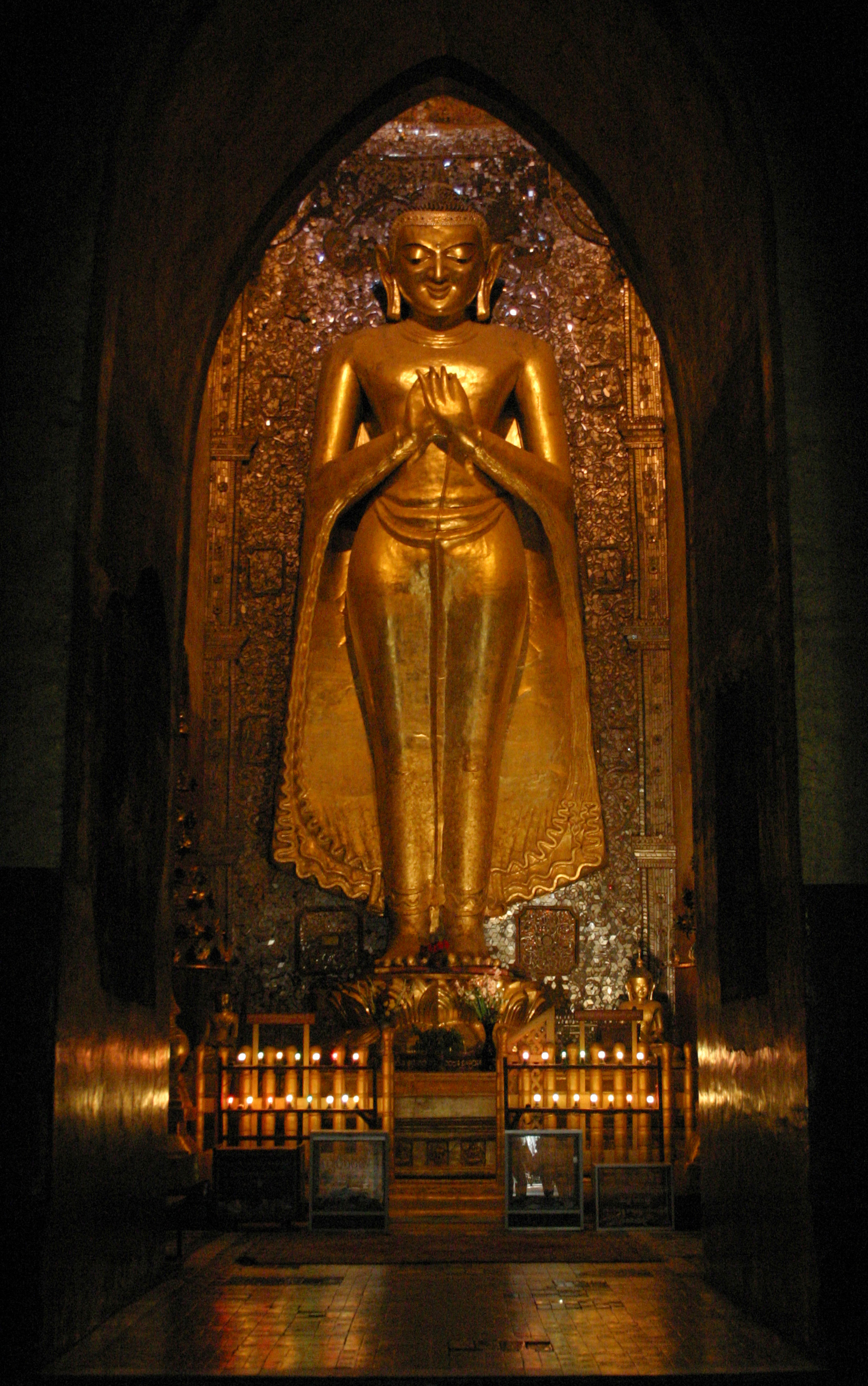
Standing Buddha – Kakusandha – North facing

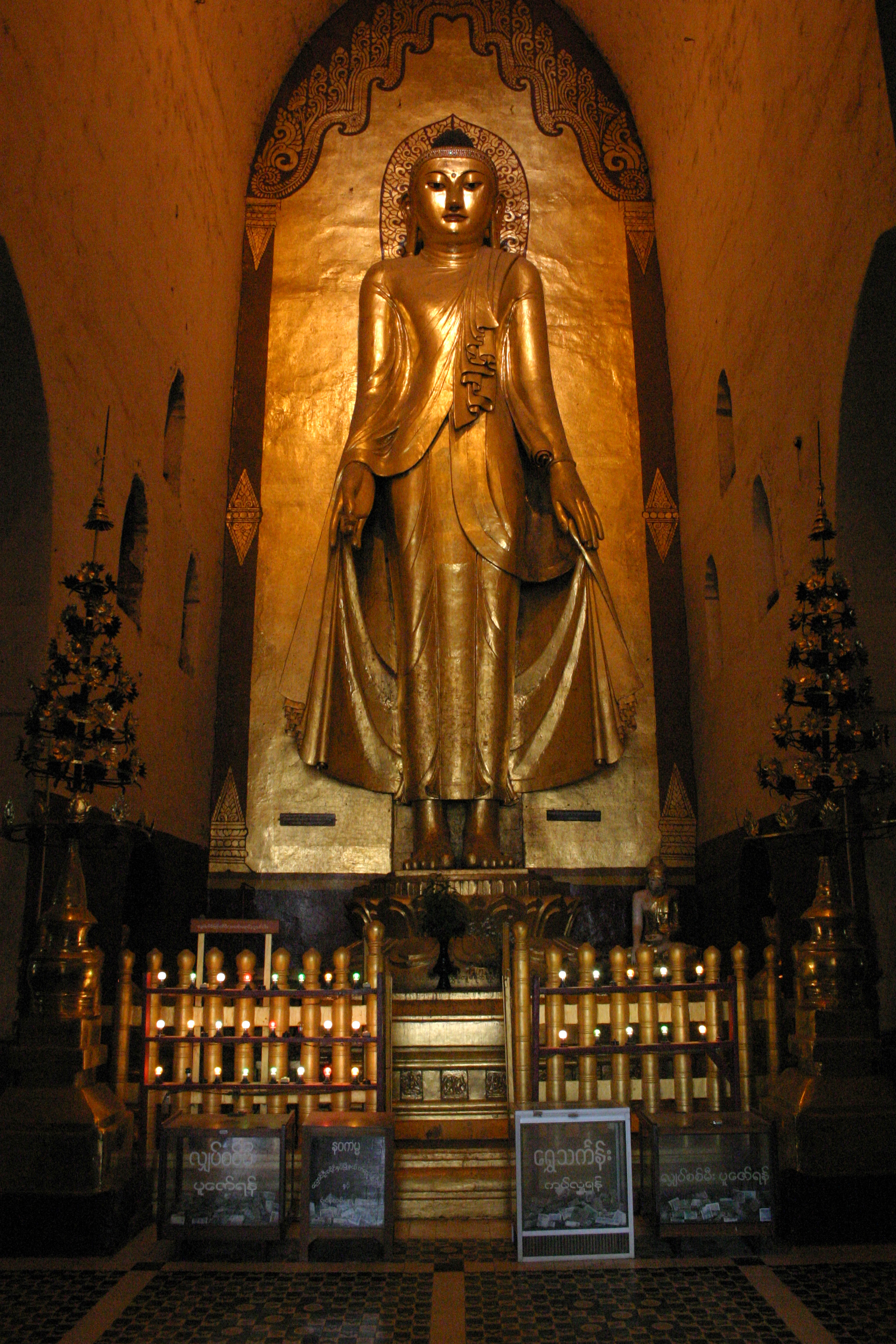
Standing Buddha – Konagamana – East facing

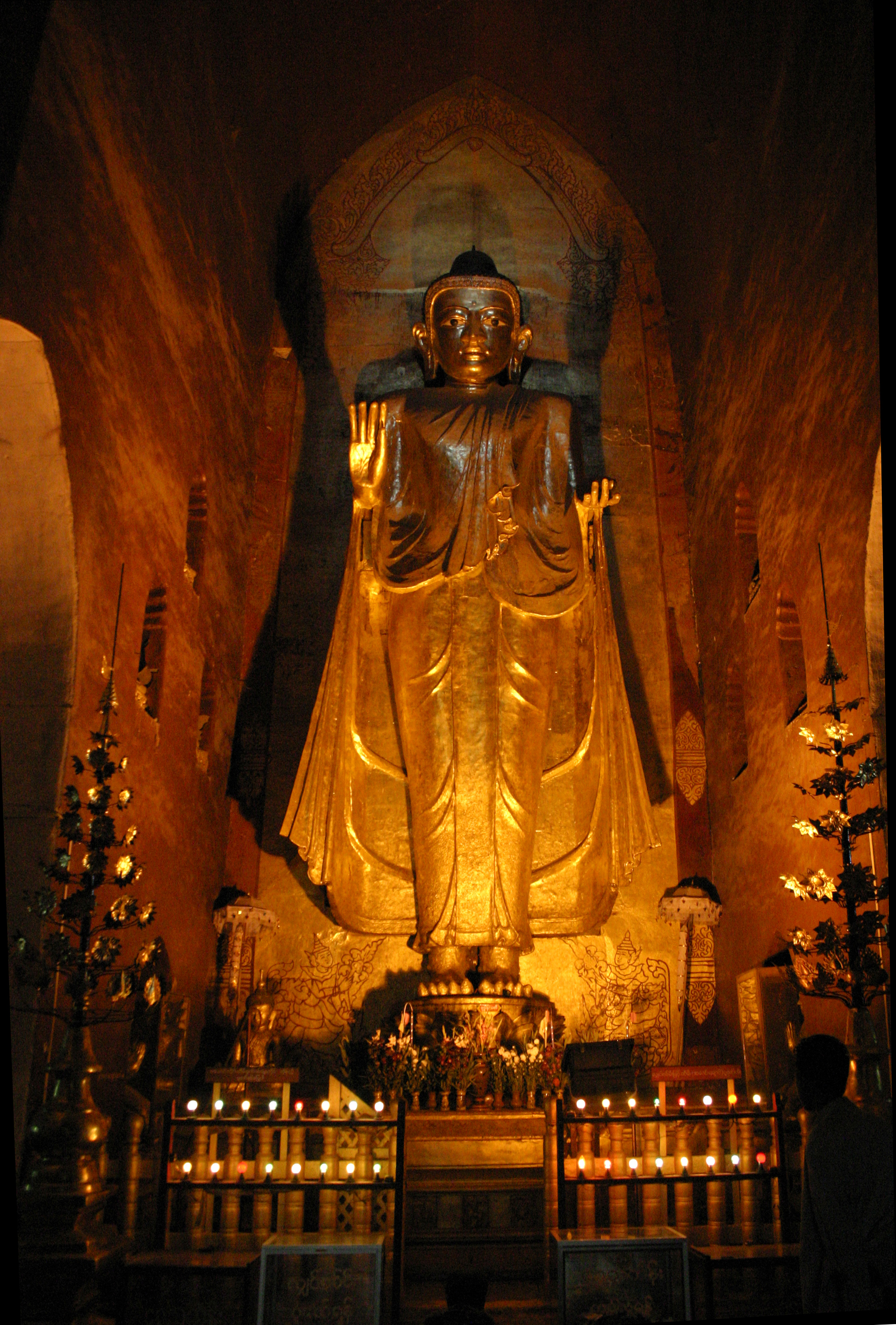
Standing Buddha – Gautama – West facing

The four standing Buddhas (pictured) are adorned with gold leaf and each Buddha image faces a direction, from north to south, stated to represent attainment of a state of nirvana; each is given a specific name, Kassapa (in Pāli, it is the name of a Buddha, the third of the five Buddhas’ of the present kalpa (the Bhaddakappa or 'Fortunate Aeon'), and the sixth of the six Buddhas prior to the historical Buddha) – south facing, Kakusandha (in (Pāli) is the name of the twenty-fifth Buddha, the first of the five Buddhas of the present kalpa, and the fourth of the seven ancient Buddhas) – north facing, Konagamana (the name of the twenty-sixth Buddha, the second of the five Buddhas of the present era, and the fifth of the seven ancient Buddhas) – east facing, and Gautama facing west. Out of the four images, the images facing north and south are said to be original, of the Bagan-style depicting the dhammachakka mudra, a hand position symbolizing the Buddha's first sermon, while the other two images are new replacements, after the originals were destroyed by fires. All the four images are made of solid teak wood (some say that the southern image is made of a bronze alloy). The four Buddhas placed in the sanctum, called the "Buddhas of the modern age", give an indication of Buddha's "sense of the omnipresence through space and time".

The original south facing Buddha (called the Kassapa) has a unique architectural display, as, when it is viewed from close quarters depicts a sad look. However, the same image viewed from a distance gives an expression of mirthfulness.

The east and west facing Buddha images are made in the later Konbaung or Mandalay style. The east-facing image of Buddha (known as 'Kongamana') is shown holding, between the thumb and middle finger, a small nutlike sphere – a herb. This herb is said to symbolically represent the Buddha suggesting dhamma (Buddhist philosophy) as a cure for misery and distress. In this mudra, both arms hang at the sides with palms stretching out. This mudra is not seen in traditional Buddhist sculpture outside this temple.

In the west-facing Buddha, titled Gautama, the abhaya mudra is displayed – with hands outstretched in the gesture of fearlessness. At the feet of this Buddha two life-size statues made in lacquer, representing the crowned figure of King Kyanzittha kneeling piously in prayer, and Shin Arahan, the Mon monk who converted the King into Theravada Buddhism (meaning "the Teaching of the Elders") and as a primate also crowned the king, are also displayed. The western portico also depicts two Buddha footprint symbols on pedestals. An inscription below the small image of the King states that the King perceived himself as a "bodhisattva, a cakkavattin and incarnation of Lord Vishnu".

=== Plaques ===
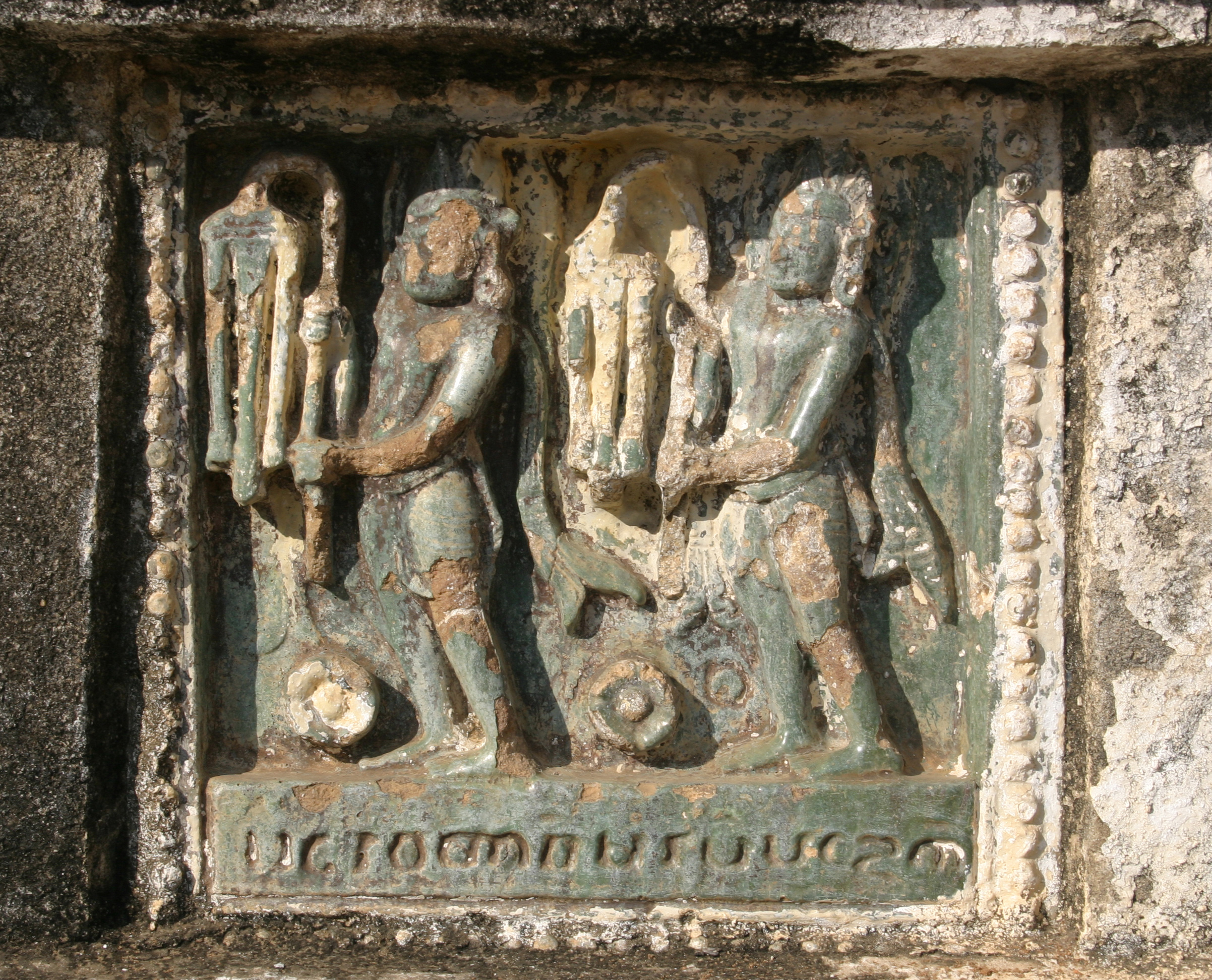
A typical plaque with inscription at the bottom

Plaques are a special feature in the temple complex, which depict jataka tales; each plaque made of glazed Terra-cotta tiles representing one story of the jataka. Plethora of plaques is seen on the temple walls and terraces (five numbers). These are: at the base of the structure extending, from south to west, there are 552 images of Mara’s marching warriors intending to attack Buddha, and also a procession of gods; west to the north entrance warriors are shown vanquished by supernatural powers of Buddha; southwest comer of the first terrace to the northern side of the third terrace display 537 plaques, each related to a specific story from Jataka tales; on the northern side of the second terrace up to the fifth terrace depictions are from Tey Mi Jataka; the fifth terrace depicts 547 plaques of stories of Vessantara Jataka in two parts, 537 plaques in the first tier and the second set above the first tier on the roof depict 375 plaques of the last ten jatakas, the Mahanipata; the last ten lives of the Buddha are depicted in plaques of green colour. There are depictions of camels on the plaques, suggesting the influence of trade routes on the region.

=== Stone images ===
The stone sculptures, in the outer vaulted corridors, are considered unique in Bagan. 1500 stone images (mostly unclear due to wear and tear) are seen inside the temple. The special images carved from a single rock (average size is 3.5 feet (1.1 m) high, 2.42 feet (0.74 m) broad and 1 foot (0.30 m) thick) are those that depict 80 episodes from Buddha's life. Also seen are forty episodes from the last life of the Lord Buddha, beginning with an image of Setaketu Deva to Prince Siddhartha peeping through the tapestry for a last look at his consort Yasodhara and his newborn son Rahula, before he left the palace for the life of recluse in the forest.

=== Paintings ===
Wall paintings inside the prayer halls of the temple have been mostly white washed. Some of the paintings still discernible on the south-west column of the northern devotional hall have been restored by the Department of Archaeology of Myanmar. Some of the paintings seen in good condition are: on the walls and ceiling of the eastern devotional hall; the pictures of re-appeared Buddha, north of the statue of standing Buddhas, Arahats and lotus flowers; and floral designs on the western entrance.

== Other structures ==
Ananda Okkyaung is a brick monastery located within the precincts of the Ananda Temple. It was built in 1137 AD. Paintings of the 18th century are seen in the walls of the monastery, which also have an inscription that attributes building of the monastery to three brothers. Shin Thuddhammalinkara, a highly venerated monk lived here.

Tharabha Gate is the only surviving gate of the ancient Bagan city (previously known as Pagan); the Ananda temple is located to its southeast. Tharabar, a word derived from the Pali word "Sarabhanga", which literally means "shielded against arrows". Tharabar was one of the 12 gates of entry to the Pagan city built by King Pyinbya, in 849 AD. Some stucco engravings of ogres are still seen on the gate. It is believed that two spirits protect it namely, the brother Mahagiri ("Lord of the Great Mountain") on the left of the gate and the sister Hnamadawgyi ("Golden Face") on the right side.

== Museum ==
A field museum has been established near the Ananda temple in Pagan. The purpose is to study the artifacts in the ambience of their original settings.

== Japanese invasion (currency) ==
The Ananda temple was put on the Currency of The State of Burma.

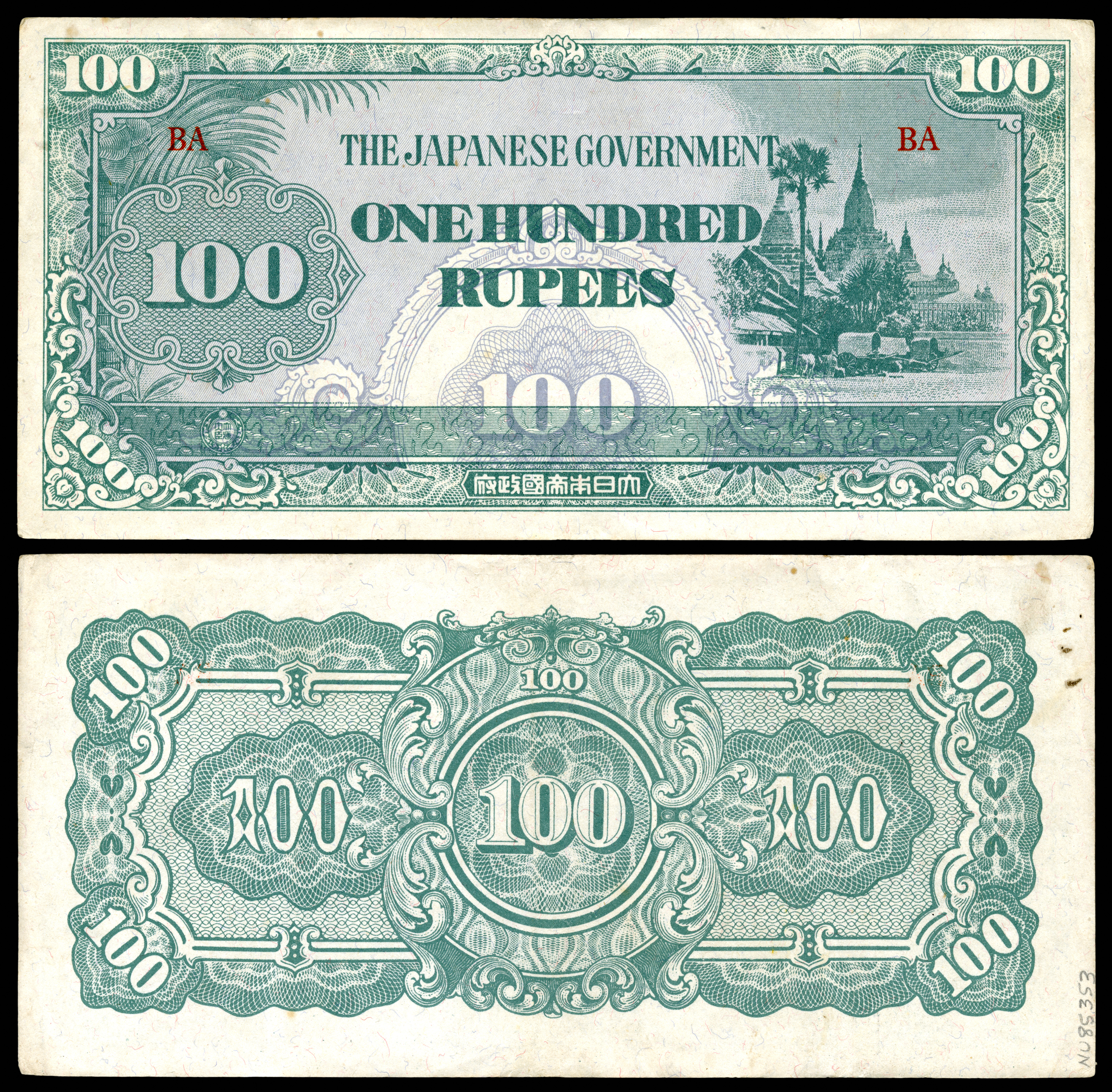
The Temple showed on the One Hundred Rupee banknote.

== Festivals ==
The temple is also home to an annual week-long pagoda festival that is held during the month of Pyatho (December to January). During the festival, 1,000 monks perform continuous chanting of scriptures for 72 hours. Thousands of villagers from miles around set up encampments around the temple. On the morning of the full moon day, they offer gift bowls to the monks in attendance.

== See also ==
- List of tallest structures built before the 20th century

== Bibliography ==
- Fiala, Robert D. (2002), Ananda Pahto Temple, Oriental Architecture
