= Sular Mani Lawkachanthar Temple =

Temple in Shan State, Myanmar

Coordinates: 20°45′52.4″N 97°02′46.3″E

Sular Mani lawkachanthar Temple
- စူဠာမုနိလောကချမ်းသာစေတီတော်
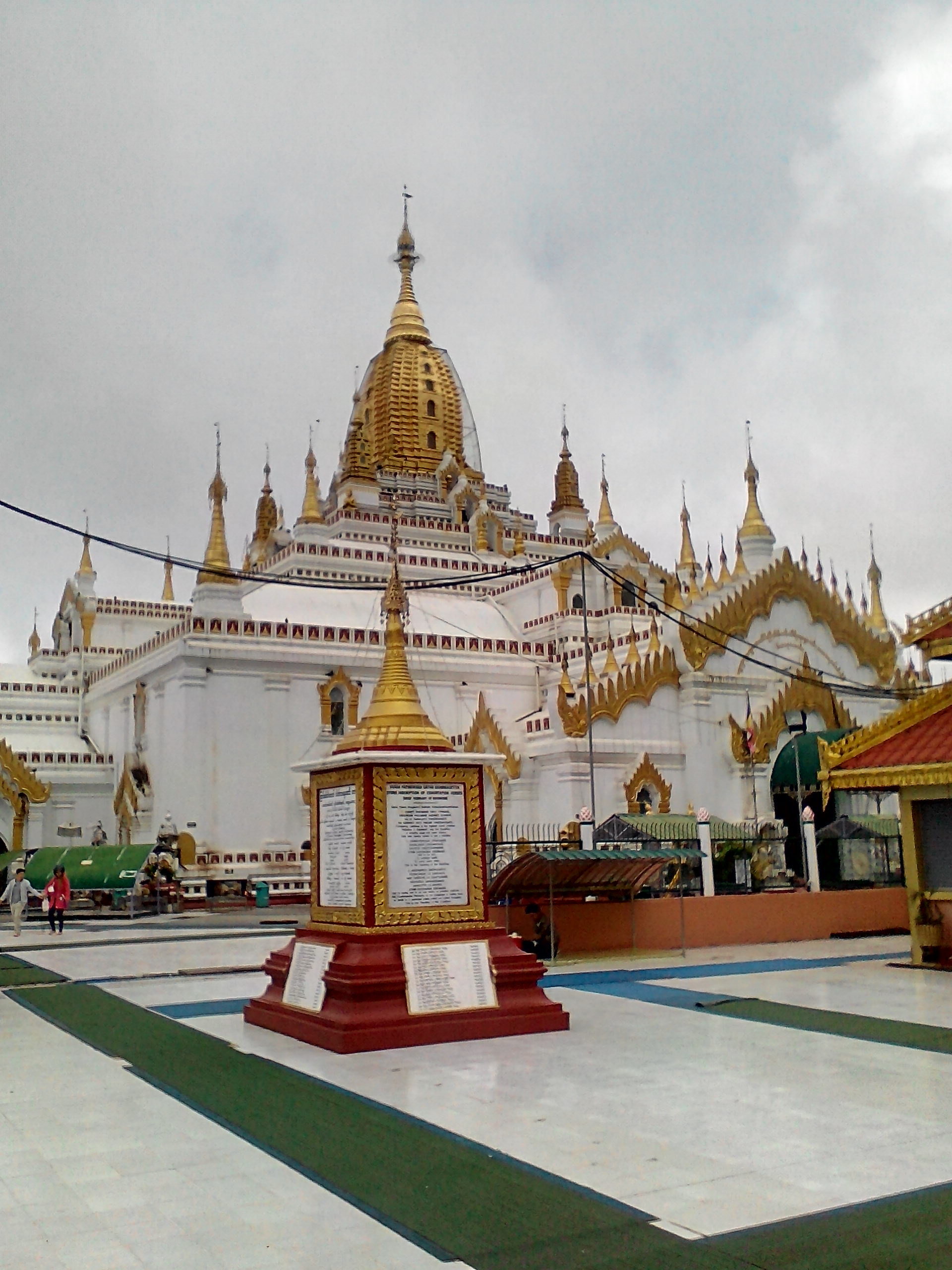
- Sular Mani lawkachanthar Temple

- Location within Burma

Religion
- Affiliation: Theravada Buddhism

Location
- Country: Myanmar

Sular Mani lawkachanthar Temple is located in Taunggyi, Shan State, Myanmar. The temple is proportionally built like the original Ananda Temple that was worshiped by King Kyansittha of the Pagan Dynasty.
