= Tharabha Gate =

Gate near the Ananda Pagoda in Old Bagan, Myanmar

Coordinates: 21.17°N 94.86°E

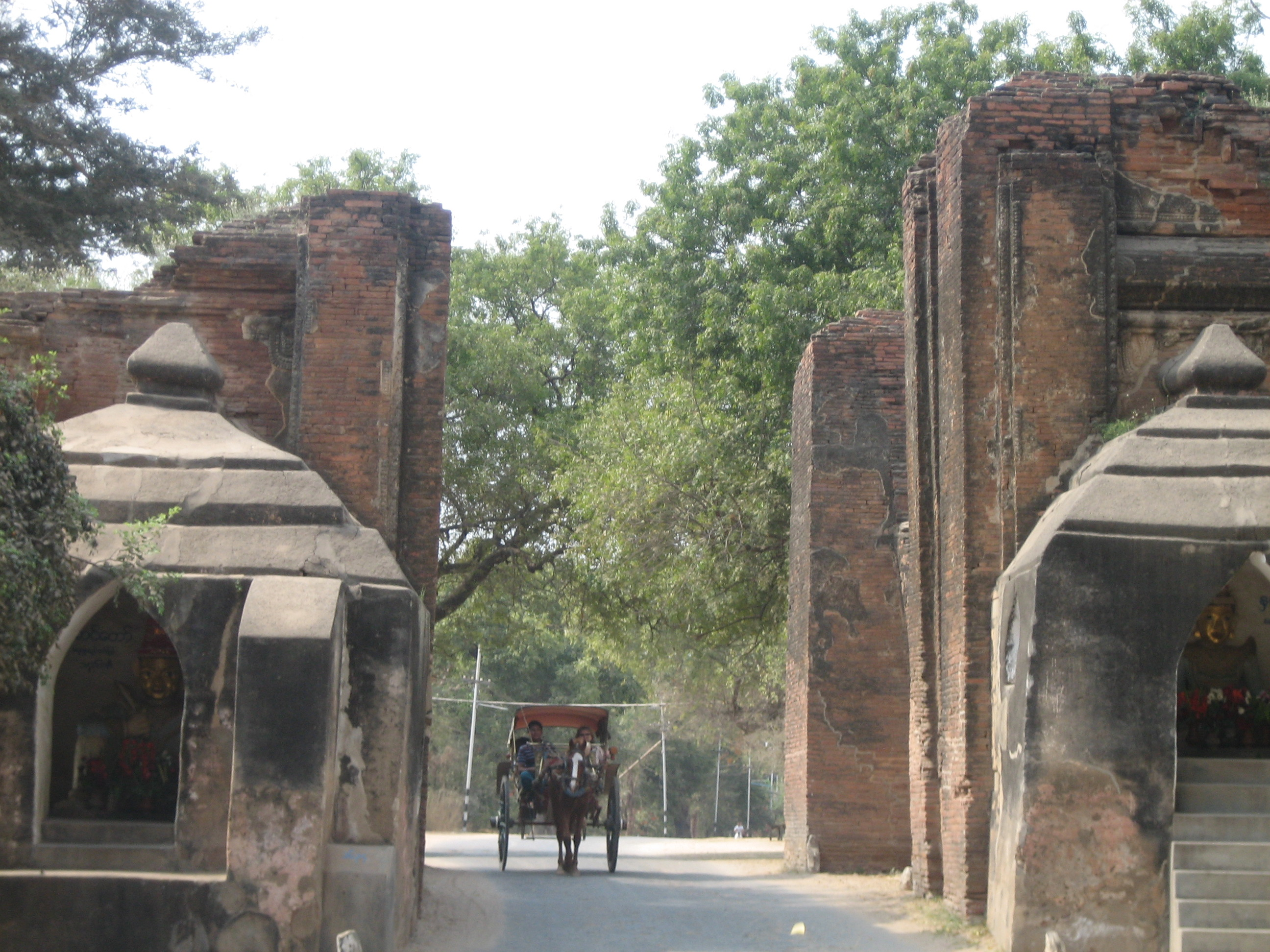
The Tharabha Gate

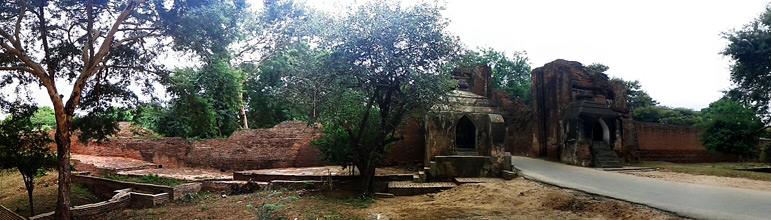
Tharabha Gate

The Tharabha Gate (Burmese: သရပါ တံခါး, IPA: [θəɹəbà dəɡá]; also spelled Sarabha or Tharaba) is the only surviving gate of Bagan (Pagan). The gate is located to the east of the old city. Although the Burmese chronicles assert that the city of Bagan was fortified in 849 CE, radiocarbon dating of evidence dates the foundation of the main walls to c. 1020 CE. If the city was fortified in the 9th century as the chronicles assert, the fortifications must have been built with less durable materials like mud.

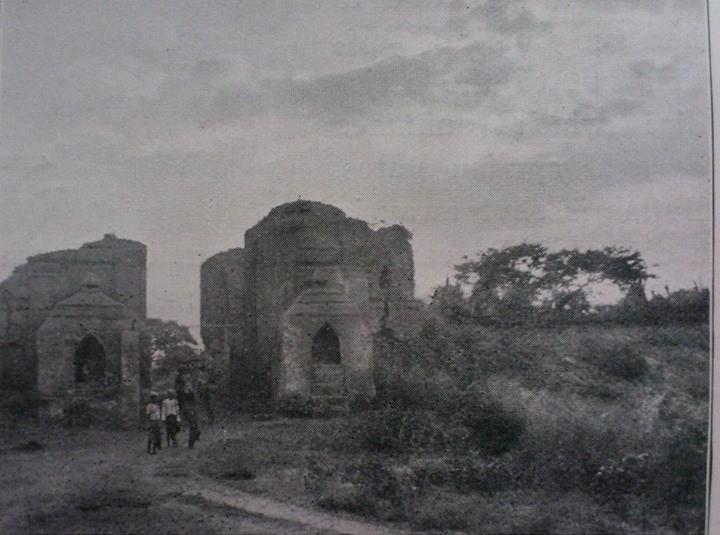
Tharaba Gate in 1890s

The present-day gate consists of two opposing brick shrines dedicated to two guardian nats, named Min Mahagiri and Hnamadawgyi (Shwemyethna), who allegedly were executed by order of a king. The Gate allegedly has no doors, mostly due to corroding and other reasons.

== 3D Documentation ==
The Zamani Project from the University of Cape Town, South Africa, offered its services towards the spatial documentation of monuments in Bagan in response to the destruction of monuments by an earthquake in August 2016 including the Tharabha Gate.
