= Mahagiri =

Nat (Burmese Folk Deity)

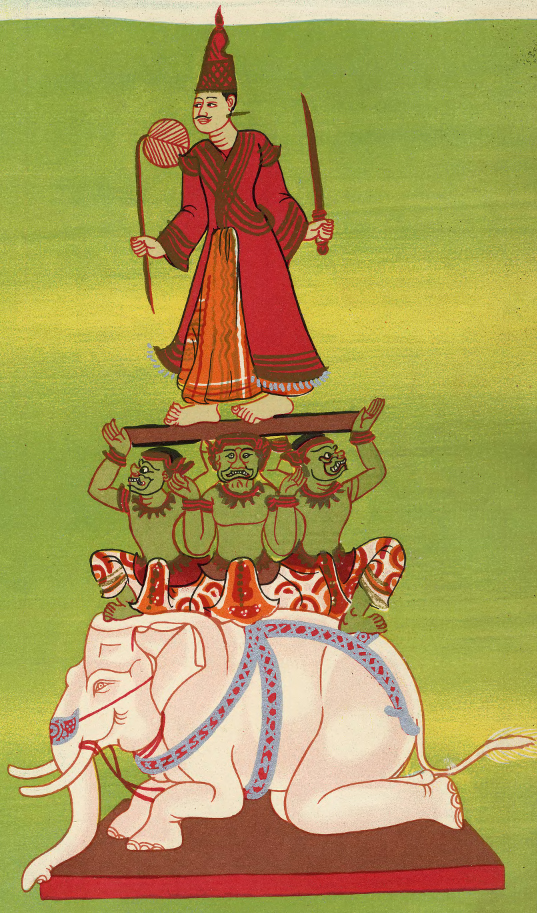
Maha Giri Nat

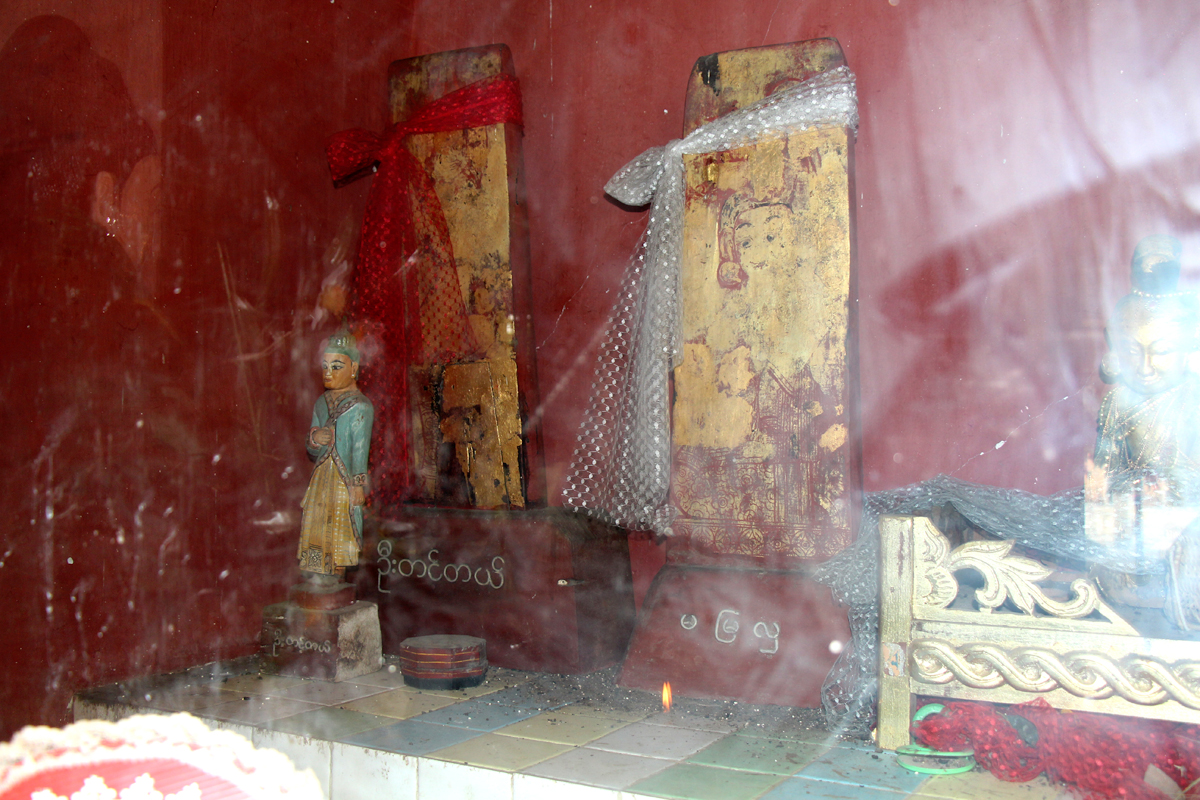
A shrine to Mahagiri and his sister at Shwezigon Pagoda

Min Mahagiri (မင်းမဟာဂီရိ, Burmese pronunciation: [məhà ɡìɹḭ], lit. Lord of the Great Mountain), also called Eindwin Nat (အိမ်တွင်းနတ်), is one of the Thirty-seven nats in the Burmese pantheon. He is the chief of the household nats and is closely associated with the origins of nat worship in Myanmar. The cult of the 37 nats is often said to have begun with the worship of Min Mahagiri.

== Biography ==
According to tradition, Min Mahagiri was born Maung Tint De (မောင်တင့်တယ်; also called Nga Tinde, ငတင့်တယ်), the son of the master blacksmith U Tint Daw and his wife Daw Naw in Tagaung. He had two younger sisters: Ma Myat Hla (also called Saw Me Ya or Shwe Myet-hna, meaning "Golden Face") and Htwe Phyu (also known as Tsang Pan Hla Nat). From a young age, Maung Tint De was extraordinarily strong, reputedly able to break an elephant's tusk with his bare hands and to work iron with hammers weighing up to 100 pisas without pause.

His great strength aroused the suspicion of the King of Tagaung, who feared he might usurp the throne. Maung Tint De fled to the forests near Mount Popa, where he met Swe Nabe Nat, daughter of the Naga King Shwe Nabe. They married and had two children, Shin Phyu and Shin Nyo.

== Death and deification ==
Unable to capture Maung Tint De, the King of Tagaung devised a ruse by marrying his sister Ma Myat Hla and persuading her to invite her brother back, claiming he was to be appointed governor. When Maung Tint De returned, he was arrested and executed by being burned alive while tied to a champak (စံကားဝါပင်) tree. His sister chose to die with him, and the siblings became vengeful nats inhabiting that tree, attacking those who came near.

The king ordered the tree cut down and cast into the Irrawaddy River, where it floated to Bagan. There, during the reign of King Thinligyaung (344–387 CE), the spirits appeared to the king in a dream, offering to protect the city in exchange for a place to dwell. The tree trunk was brought to Mount Popa, divided in two, and carved with human features—one for each nat. From then on, Maung Tint De was venerated as Min Mahagiri, "Lord of the Great Mountain."

They were also enshrined on either side of the Tharabha Gate in Bagan—Min Mahagiri on the right and Shwe Myet-hna on the left. Later Burmese kings had golden heads of the two nats made and mounted on pillars at Mount Popa; the heads from 1812 are still worshipped today.

== Iconography ==
Min Mahagiri is typically depicted as a giant seated on a white elephant, holding a turban and a sword—symbols of princely authority—in his left hand. His sister, Hnamadawgyi, is often shown alongside him.

== Legacy ==
Min Mahagiri remains one of the most important and widely venerated nats in Myanmar. He is regarded as the chief guardian of households and is closely linked with Mount Popa, considered the spiritual center of nat worship in the country.
