= Hnamadawgyi =

Burmese nat (spirit)

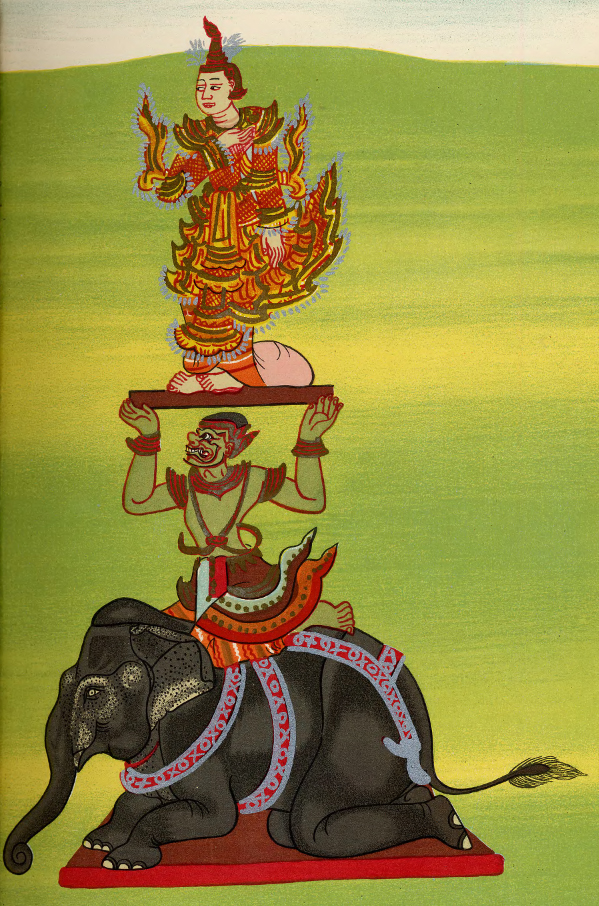
Hnamadawgyi nat

Hnamadawgyi (Burmese: နှမတော်ကြီး, pronounced [n̥əma̰dɔ̀dʑí]; lit. 'Royal Sister'; also known as Shwemyethna; Burmese: ရွှေမျက်နှာ) is one of the 37 nats in the Burmese pantheon of nats. She is the nat representation of Myat Hla, sister of Maung Tint De. According to tradition, she was a queen of the King of Tagaung. When she saw her brother Tintde being burned alive, she leapt into the fire, but only managed to save his head. She died of her burns and became a nat. She is portrayed standing on a dais upon a black elephant, her right hand on her chest with a plum between her thumb and index finger, and her left hand by her side. She is also known for having a monkey companion, Shwe Min Wun.
