= Burmese–Siamese War (1765–1767) =

Conflict between the Burmese Empire and the Thai kingdom of Ayutthaya

War of the Second Fall of Ayutthaya
- Part of the Burmese–Siamese wars
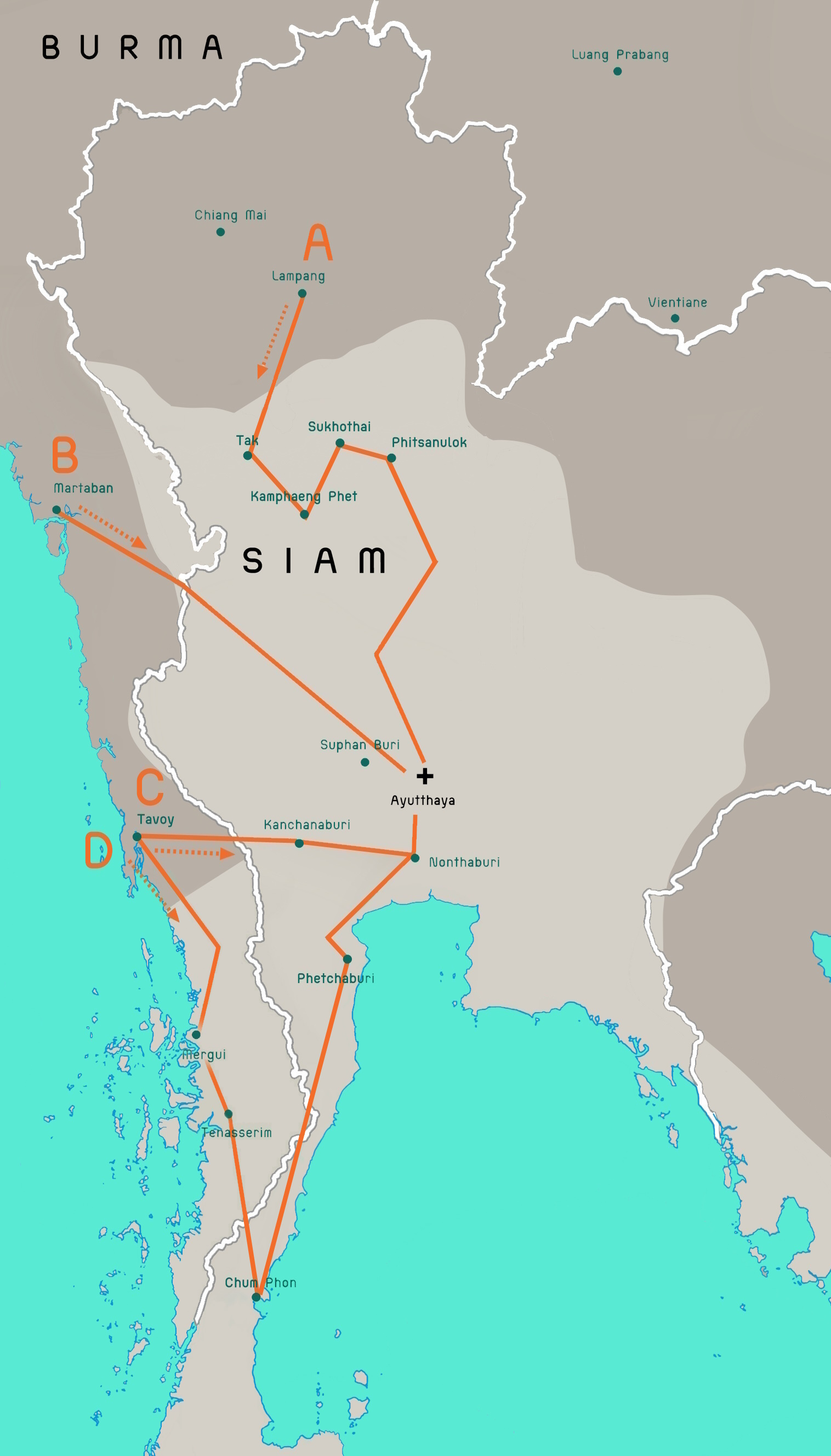
- Sketch-map showing Burmese forces' advance towards Ayutthaya: The territories shown are those at the time being; Siam; Burma and its vassals; Third territories; Routes of advance (main attack routes shown in A and C); Present-day border
| Date | 23 August 1765 – 7 April 1767 (1 year, 7 months, 2 weeks, and 1 day) |
| Location | Tenasserim, Siam |
| Result | Burmese victory |
| Territorial changes | Burma temporarily captures most of Ayutthaya's major cities; by 1770, only Tenasserim remains under Burmese control |

Belligerents
| Konbaung dynasty (Burma) | Ayutthaya Kingdom (Siam) |

Commanders and leaders
| Hsinbyushin; Tavoy column: Maha Nawrahta; Nemyo Gonnarat; Mingyi Sanda; Mingyi Zeyathu; Metkya Bo; Teingya Minkhaung; Pierre de Milard; Chiang Mai column: Ne Thihapate; Satpagyon Bo; Thado Mindin; Thiri Yazathingyan; Nanda Kyawdin | Ekkathat †; Chaophraya Phrakhlang (POW); Chaophraya Phitsanulok; Nakhon Thammarat; Phraya Rattanathibet; Phraya Yommaraj (POW); Phraya Phollathep (POW); Phraya Rueang †; Phraya Tak William Powney |

Units involved
| Royal Burmese Army: Shan regiments; Laotian regiments; European regiments; Mon regiments; Cassay Horse; Siamese levies | Royal Siamese Army; Royal Siamese Navy; Including: 1 British sloop-of-war |

Strength
| Initial invasion force: 40,000 to 50,000: Northern front: 20,000; Southern front: 20,000–30,000; Nonthaburi: 20,000; Outer Ayutthaya: 50,000; Siege of Ayutthaya: 40,000+ | Initial defenses: Northern front: unknown; Southern front: over 60,000; Nonthaburi: 60,000; 1 British sloop-of-war Outer Ayutthaya: 50,000; Siege of Ayutthaya: unknown |

Casualties and losses
| Unknown | Approximately 200,000 soldiers and civilians killed |

The Burmese–Siamese War of 1765–1767, also known as the War of the Second Fall of Ayutthaya (Thai: สงครามคราวเสียกรุงศรีอยุธยาครั้งที่สอง) was the second military conflict between Burma under the Konbaung dynasty and Ayutthaya Kingdom under the Siamese Ban Phlu Luang dynasty that lasted from 1765 until 1767; the war ended the 417-year-old Ayutthaya Kingdom.

Burma under the new Konbaung dynasty emerged powerful in the mid-18th century. King Alaungpaya, the dynastic founder, led his Burmese forces of 40,000 men, and with his son Prince of Myedu as vanguard commander, invaded Siam in late 1759 to early 1760. The Burmese reached and attacked Ayutthaya in April 1760 but the arrival of rainy season and sudden illness of Alaungpaya prompted the Burmese to retreat. The traditional Siamese strategy of passive stand in the Ayutthaya citadel against Burmese besiegers worked for one last time, postponing the eventual fall of Ayutthaya for seven years. Alaungpaya died in May 1760 on his way from Siam back to Burma. Burmese invasion of Siam in 1760, in which the Burmese, particularly Prince Myedu, had an opportunity to learn about Siamese geography, strategy and tactics and to reflect about their own flaws in the campaign, served as the foundation of the next Burmese invasion in 1765–1767. Prince Myedu ascended the Burmese throne as King Hsinbyushin in late 1763. Hsinbyushin inherited military energy and prowess from his father Alaungpaya and was determined to accomplish his father's unfinished mission of conquering Ayutthaya.

Burma sent forces to successfully conquer Lanna Chiang Mai in 1762–1763. In 1764, new Burmese king Hsinbyushin sent Ne Myo Thihapate with Burmese forces of 20,000 men to subjugate petty rebellions in Lanna and to proceed to invade Ayutthaya. Hsinbyushin also sent another 20,000 men under Maha Nawrahta to attack Siam from Tavoy in another direction, inflicting two-pronged pincer attack onto Ayutthaya. Siam, centered on the royal capital of Ayutthaya, was relatively defenseless against the militaristic Burmese. Due to long absence of external threats, the Siamese defense system had been largely in disuse since the late seventeenth century. Chronic manpower shortage also crippled Siamese defense. Nemyo Thihapate conquered Lao kingdoms of Luang Prabang and Vientiane in March 1765. With the Burmese conquests of Lanna and Laos, the Burmese took control and outflanked Siam's northern frontiers and also had access to vast manpower and other resources.

In early 1765, Maha Nawrahta, from his base at Tavoy, sent his vanguard forces to invade and conquer Western Siamese provincial towns. Nemyo Thihapate, with his Burmese-Lanna contingents, descended onto Northern Siam in August 1765. Ayutthaya adopted hyper-centralized defensive strategy by calling provincial forces to defend Ayutthaya, focusing on protecting the royal city itself, leaving peripheral provincial cities less defended and at the mercy of Burmese invaders. Within the conquered Siamese provincial cities, Burmese commanders recruited local Siamese men to join their ranks. In October 1765, Maha Nawrahta, with his main Tavoy column, invaded Siamese Chao Phraya heartland. William Powney the British merchant, at the request of Ayutthayan court, engaged with Maha Nawrahta's Burmese forces in the Battle of Nonthaburi in December 1765 but the Burmese prevailed.

Maha Nawrahta, with his Tavoy column coming from the west and Nemyo Thihapate with his Lanna column coming from the north, converged on Ayutthaya in January to February 1766, setting foot on the outskirts of Ayutthaya. Maha Nawrahta took position at Siguk to the west of Ayutthaya, while Nemyo Thihapate encamped at Paknam Prasop to the north of Ayutthaya. Siamese king Ekkathat sent Siamese defense forces in attempts to dislodge Burmese invaders from those places but failed. Siamese resistance group known as Bang Rachan emerged in February 1766 and ended in June, though not significantly impacting the course of the war but showcasing a side story of Siamese patriotic deeds that was later emphasized and celebrated by modern nationalistic Thai historiography of later centuries.

For fourteen months, from February 1766 to April 1767, Ayutthaya endured the Burmese siege. Ayutthaya invoked the traditional strategy of passive stand inside of the Ayutthaya citadel, relying on two main defenses; the supposedly impregnable city wall fortified by French architects during the reign of King Narai and the arrival of wet rainy season. The Ayutthayans initially fared well as the foods and provisions were plentiful and the Siamese simply waited for the Burmese to leave but the Burmese besiegers did not intend to retreat. Learning from the previous invasion of 1760, King Hsinbyushin innovated and devised new strategy to overcome Siamese defenses. The Burmese would not leave during rainy season but would stand their grounds and endured wet swamps in order to pressure Ayutthaya into surrender. Burmese besiegers closed in and approached Ayutthaya in September 1766, with Nemyo Thihapate coming closer at Phosamton and Maha Nawrahta at Wat Phukhaothong temple. By late 1766, the situation became dire and desperate for Ayutthayan inhabitants as they ran out of food and resources, many simply surrendering themselves to the Burmese.

Desperate, a Siamese military man of Teochew Chinese descent known as Phraya Tak gathered his Chinese–Siamese forces to break through the Burmese line to Eastern Siam in early January 1767, seeking for new position. Developing simultaneously was the Sino-Burmese War. Conflicts between Burma and Qing China over the frontier Shan States led to Yang Yingju the viceroy of Yungui sending Chinese Green Banner forces to directly invade Burma in October 1766. This prompted Burmese king Hsinbyushin, in January 1767, to command the Burmese besiegers in Ayutthaya to finish up the conquest of Ayutthaya in order to divert their forces to the Chinese front. Maha Nawrahta then escalated the siege by constructing twenty-seven forts surrounding Ayutthaya. In February to March 1767, Ayutthaya sent out volunteer Chinese and Portuguese Catholic fighters as the last line of defense, who were also defeated. Maha Nawrahta died from illness in March 1767, leaving his colleague Nemyo Thihapate to assume commands over the whole Burmese besieging forces.

Nemyo Thihapate came up with a tactic to circumvent the Ayutthayan wall by digging underground tunnels into Ayutthaya. In early April 1767, the Burmese, through the tunnels, set fire to the roots of the wall, causing the northeastern portion of Ayutthayan wall to collapse, allowing the Burmese to eventually enter Ayutthaya. Ayutthaya, Siamese royal capital for four centuries, fell to the Burmese on 7 April 1767. What followed were violent scenes of the Burmese massacring of the inhabitants, burning of Siamese royal palaces, temples and vernacular structures and looting for treasures. Ekkathat, the last king of Ayutthaya, was either killed by a random gunshot or by starvation. 30,000 Siamese people, along with members of the fallen dynasty, craftsmen and cultural artifacts were all taken back to Burma. Nemyo Thihapate occupied the ruins of Ayutthaya for two months until his departure in June 1767, leaving only a small contingent under the Mon official Thugyi at Phosamton to oversee the short-lived Burmese occupation of Lower Central Siam, while the other part of the kingdom fragmented into a number of competing regional regimes.

Burma diverted most of Ayutthaya occupation forces to the Chinese front, giving Siam a golden opportunity to resurge. Phraya Tak, the Siamese leader of Teochew Chinese heritage, who had earlier taken position in Eastern Siam, raised troops there to expel the Burmese and reconquered Ayutthaya-Thonburi area in November 1767. Ayutthaya was too ruinous and untenable to serve as Siam's capital so Phraya Tak, newly enthroned as King Taksin in December 1767, moved the Siamese royal seat to Thonburi south of Ayutthaya. Ayutthaya continued to exist as a second-class provincial towns, with its structural bricks dismantled for construction of Bangkok and its wealth looted by treasure hunters. After finishing the Chinese war in 1769, Hsinbyushin resumed the campaign to attack Siamese Thonburi kingdom in 1775–1776. However, Siam under the new regime was more resilient and competent at defense against Burmese invasions. Burmese invasion of Siam in 1785–1786 would be the last major large-scale Burmese invasion of Siam in history. Siam lost Tenaserim to Burma for perpetuity in 1765, becoming modern Tanintharyi region (Siam attempted to regain Tenasserim in 1792–1794 but failed.), in exchange for taking control of Lanna or modern Northern Thailand from Burma in 1775.

== Background ==
=== Rise of the Konbaung dynasty ===
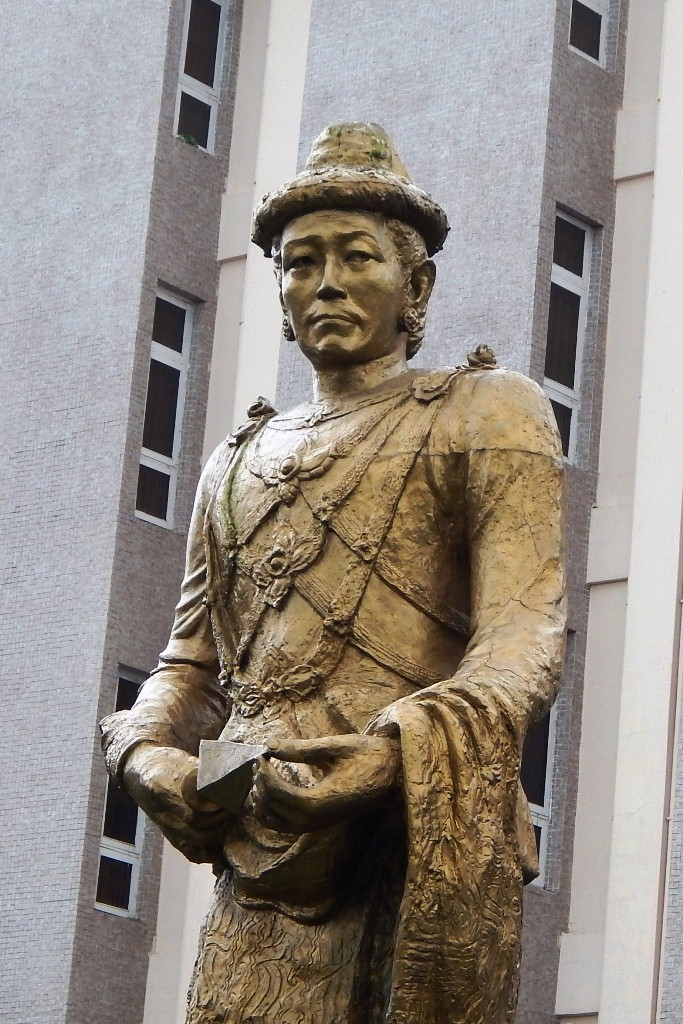
Statue of King Alaungpaya at National Museum of Myanmar in Yangon; Alaungpaya, formerly known as Aung Zeiya, was proclaimed king in 1752 and founded the Konbaung dynasty.

With the weakening of centuries-old Burmese Toungoo dynasty by mid-eighteenth century, the Mons in Lower Burma were able to break free and form their own kingdom. The Mons elected the monk Smim Htaw Buddhaketi to be their king of their Restored Hanthawaddy Kingdom in 1740. Smim Htaw, however, was deposed by a coup and replaced by his prime minister Binnya Dala in 1747 with Smim Htaw fleeing to Ayutthaya. Maha Damayaza Dipati, the last king of Toungoo dynasty, had authorities only in Upper Burma. Binnya Dala sent his brother Upayaza to lead Mon armies to conquer Upper Burma in 1751. Upayaza was able to seize Ava, the Burmese royal capital, in 1752, capturing Maha Damayaza Dipati to Pegu and ending the Toungoo dynasty.

When Ava was falling to the Mon invaders, a local village chief of Moksobo named U Aung Zeiya rallied Burmese patriots to rise against the Mons. Aung Zeiya was enthroned as King Alaungpaya in 1752, founding the new Burmese Konbaung dynasty. Siam took hostile attitudes towards the Mon kingdom, leading to the Mons being preoccupied with possible Siamese threats from the east and allowing Alaungpaya to gather his Burmese forces and consolidate in Upper Burma. Alaungpaya's son Thado Minsaw (later Hsinbyushin) retook Ava from the Mons in 1754. Alaungpaya mobilized his Burmese forces to invade Lower Burma in the same year, capturing Prome in 1755 and attacking Syriam, where British and French traders had been residing, in 1756. Alaungpaya took Syriam in 1756 and killed French officials there for he was informed that the French had supported the Mons. Alaungpaya also seized two French ships containing field guns, thousands of flintlock muskets and other ammunitions – a great haul to Burmese armory. Alaungpaya then laid siege on Pegu, the Mon royal seat. The panicked Mon King Binnya Dala executed the former Burmese king Maha Damayaza Dipati, inadvertently giving Alaungpaya full legitimacy as the savior of Burmese nation. Alaungpaya seized Pegu in May 1757, thus unifying Upper and Lower Burma under him. Pegu was destroyed and the political administrative center of Lower Burma shifted from Pegu to Rangoon.

=== Internal developments of Ayutthaya ===
Burmese armies had not reached the outskirts of Ayutthaya since 1586 and, after King Naresuan's victory over the Battle of Nong Sarai in 1593, there had not been serious threatening Burmese invasions since then. In the aftermath of Siamese Revolution of 1688, Phetracha ascended the throne and founded his Ban Phlu Luang dynasty of the Late Ayutthaya Period, which was known for internal conflicts, including those in 1689, 1699, 1703 and 1733, owing to increasing powers of royal princes and nobility. Phetracha faced undaunting rebellions at regional centers of Nakhon Ratchasima (Khorat) and Nakhon Si Thammarat (Ligor) in 1699–1700, which took great efforts to quell. Siamese court of Late Ayutthaya, therefore, sought to decrease the powers of provincial governors. However, this reform became a failure and Ayutthayan court eventually lost effective control over its periphery.

In pre-modern Siam, the military relied on conscripted levies as the backbone rather than professionally-trained personnel. In Late Ayutthaya Period, in early eighteenth century, Siam's rice export to Qing China grew. Siam became a prominent rice exporter into China through Teochew Chinese merchants. Siamese Phrai commoners of Central Siam, who cleared more lands and cultivated more rice for exports, became enriched through this economic prosperity and they became less willing to participate in military conscription and corvée levies. The Phrai evaded conscription through capitation taxes or commodity taxes and outright absence in order to partake in other more-profitable commercial activities. This led to overall decline of effective manpower control of Siamese Ayutthayan royal court over its own subjects. When Dowager Queen Yothathep died in 1735, there was not enough men to parade her funeral so King Borommakot had to relegate his own palace guards to join the procession. In 1742, the royal court managed to round up ten thousands of conscription evaders. Suppression of local governors means that they were less-armed and unable to provide frontline defenses against external invaders. Chronic manpower shortage undermined Siam's defense system. Government structure of Late Ayutthaya served to ensure internal stability and to prevent insurrections rather than to defend against invasions. Internal rebellions were more of realistic and immediate threats than Burmese incursions, which had become something of distant past, to Siam. Decline of manpower control and compromised defense system that would eventually lead to the Fall of Ayutthaya in 1767 left Siam vulnerable and resulted from Siamese court being unable to adapt and reform in response to changes.

==== Dynastic conflicts in Ayutthaya ====
Princely struggles began in 1755 when Prince Thammathibet, Borommakot's eldest son who had been the Wangna or Prince of the Front Palace and heir presumptive, arrested the servants of his half-brothers Chao Sam Krom or the Three Princes, who were sons of Borommakot born to secondary consorts rather than principal queens, for the princes' violation of ranks and honors. One of the Three Princes retaliated by informing Borommakot that Thammathibet had been in romantic relationships with two of the king's consorts. Borommakot punished Thammathibet by whipping with one hundred and eighty lashes of rattan blows, according to Siamese law. Thammathibet eventually succumbed to the wounds and died in 1756. In 1757, Prince Thepphiphit, other son of Borommakot, in concert with high ministers of Chatusadom, proposed his father the king to make Prince Uthumphon the new heir. Uthumphon initially refused the position due to the fact that he had an older brother Prince Ekkathat. However, Borommakot intentionally passed over Ekkathat, citing that Ekkathat was incompetent and sure to bring disaster to the kingdom. Borommakot forced his son Ekkathat to become a Buddhist monk to keep him away from politics and made his other son Uthumphon as the new Wangna in 1757.

Borommakot died in May 1758. The Three Princes laid their claims to the throne against Uthumphon and had their armies break into royal palace to seize the guns. Five senior Buddhist prelates then beseeched the Three Princes to cease their belligerent actions. The Three Princes complied and went to visit Uthumphon to pay obeisance. However, Ekkathat secretly sent policemen to arrest the Three Princes and had them executed. Uthumphon ascended the throne as the new king but faced political pressure from his elder brother Ekkathat, who defiantly stayed in royal palace not returning to his temple despite being a Buddhist monk. Uthumphon eventually gave in and abdicated in June 1758 after merely a month on the throne. Ekkathat then eagerly left monkhood to take the throne as King Ekkathat the last king of Ayutthaya in 1758. Uthumphon became a monk at Wat Pradu Songtham Temple, earning him the epithet Khun Luang Hawat ('The King who seeks Temple'). In December 1758, Prince Thepphiphit, joined by other high-ranking ministers, came up with a conspiracy to overthrow Ekkathat in favor of Uthumphon. However, Uthumphon, not wanting the throne, chose to leak the seditious plot to Ekkathat himself. Ekkathat then had those conspiring ministers imprisoned and had his half-brother Thepphiphit board on a Dutch ship to be exiled to Sri Lankan Kingdom of Kandy. Phraya Phrakhlang the Minister of Trade was also implicated. Phrakhlang managed to pay a large sum of money to the king to avoid punishments. Ekkathat not only spared Phrakhlang but also created him Chaophraya Phrakhlang the Samuha Nayok or Prime Minister.

=== Burmese invasion of 1760 ===
In early eighteenth century, the Tenasserim Coast was divided between Burma and Siam, with Tavoy belonging to Burma and Siam having Mergui and Tenasserim. In 1742, in the face of Mon insurrection, the Burmese governors of Martaban and Tavoy took refuge in Siam. Siam then took over the whole Tenasserim Coast. With Alaungpaya's conquest of Lower Burma in 1757, Tavoy returned to Burma. In 1758, Mon dissidents attacked Rangoon and Syriam but were repelled by the Burmese. The Mons rebels took a French vessel to flee and ended up in the Siamese port of Mergui. Burma demanded that Siam hand over the Mon rebels but Siamese authorities refused, saying that it was a mere French merchant ship. Burma then took this Siamese stance as being supportive of Mon insurrections against Burma. Realizing that Burmese eastern frontiers would never be pacified with Siam advocating the Mon cause, Alaungpaya decided to attack Siam. Tenasserim Coast then became Burmese–Siamese competing grounds.

Statue of Khun Rong Palat Chu (ขุนรองปลัดชู), who was known for his stand against Burmese vanguard at Wakhao Bay in January 1760, in Wiset Chai Chan

Alaungpaya was also determined to conquer Siam as a part of Chakravartin concept of universal ruler to bring forth the new epoch of Maitreya Future Buddha. Alaungpaya and his armies left Shwebo in mid-1759 to Rangoon, where he was informed that the Siamese attacked Tavoy and Burmese trade ships were seized by the Siamese in Tavoy. Burmese vanguard, led by Minkhaung Nawrahta and the Prince of Myedu (Hsinbyushin) quickly took Mergui and Tenasserim in January 1760. King Ekathat sent an army under Phraya Yommaraj, with Phraya Phetchaburi Rueang as vanguard, to take position at the Singkhon Pass and another army under Phraya Rattanathibet as rearguard at Kuiburi. However, Phraya Yommaraj was defeated as the Burmese entered Western Siam. Phraya Rattanathibet sent his subordinate Khun Rong Palat Chu (ขุนรองปลัดชู) to face the Burmese at Wakhao Bay on the shore of Gulf of Siam near modern Prachuap Khiri Khan but was defeated by the Burmese in the Battle of Wakhao. Siamese generals, who were apparently inept compared to their battle-hardened Burmese counterparts, completely fell back to Ayutthaya. The Burmese vanguard took Kuiburi, Pranburi, Phetchaburi, Ratchaburi and Suphanburi in rapid succession. As the situation became critical, the panicked Ayutthayan court and people pleaded for the more-capable King Uthumphon to left monkhood to assume commands. Uthumphon sent Chaophraya Kalahom Khlongklaeb the Samuha Kalahom or Minister of Military with Siamese army to take position at Phakhai on the Talan River to the northwest of Ayutthaya. In the Battle of Talan, the Burmese vanguard was shelled by Siamese gunmen while crossing the river. Only when the main royal forces of Alaungpaya arrived in time to save the vanguard. Kalahom Khlongklaeb and other Siamese commanders were killed in battle.

The Burmese reached the northwestern outskirts of Ayutthaya in April 1760 and took position at Bangban. Siamese boat people and foreign merchants moved to take refuge in the southern parts of the city moat. However, Burmese forces went to attack and massacre those refugees in the southern moat and plundering the area. Nicolaas Bang, the Dutch opperhoofd of Ayutthaya, died from drowning while trying to escape the Burmese. The Burmese mounted their cannons onto constructed towers to inflict fires onto Ayutthaya. The fires hit the Suriyat Amarin Palace, the royal residence of King Ekkathat, causing the palace spire to collapse. However, the time for the Burmese was running out as the wet rainy season approached that would turn Ayutthaya's suburbs into hostile swamps bred with diseases and discomfort. Thai chronicles stated that Alaungpaya was injured from an accidental cannon explosion, while Burmese chronicles stated that Alaungpaya fell ill with dysentery. Nevertheless, Alaungpaya had to turn back, retreating through the Maesot Pass and eventually died from illness at Kinwya village, halfway between Myawaddy and the Salween River, in May 1760. Siam was thus saved from Burmese conquest for one last time.

=== Interbellum events in Burma and Siam: 1760–1763 ===
After the demise of Alaungpaya, his eldest son Naungdawgyi succeeded to the throne in 1760 as the new Burmese king but Burma descended into a short period of internal upheaval. Minkhaung Nawrahta, while returning from Siamese campaign as the rearguard, passed through Toungoo where Thado Theinkathu the Prince of Toungoo, who was a brother of Alaungpaya, attempted to arrest him by orders from the new king Naungdawgyi. Minkhaung Nawrahta then arose in rebellion and seized Ava, only to be defeated and killed. Thado Theinkathu also soon took up arms against his nephew Naungdawgyi but was also suppressed in 1762. After these events, Burma became ready again for another round of military expeditions.

Ayutthaya was saved from Burmese conquest for one last time after the retreat of Alaungpaya in May 1760 and political conflicts resumed. The more-capable Uthumphon, the former king, had left monkhood to lead commands against the Burmese invasion of 1760. In June 1760, Uthumphon visited his brother Ekkathat on one day but found Ekkathat having bare sword laying on his laps – a gesture of political aggression and enmity. Uthumphon then decided to leave royal palace and politics to become Buddhist monk at Wat Pradu temple again in mid-1760, this time permanently. In February 1761, a group of 600 Mon refugees took up arms and rebelled against Siam, taking position at Khao Nangbuat Mountain in modern Sarika, Nakhon Nayok to the east of Ayutthaya. Ekkathat sent royal forces of 2,000 men under Phraya Siharaj Decho to deal with Mon rebels. The Mons, armed with only melee sharpened wooden sticks, managed to repel Siamese forces. Ekkathat had to send another regiment of 2,000 men under Phraya Yommaraj and Phraya Phetchaburi Rueang in order to successfully put down the Mon rebellion. This showed how ineffective the Siamese military forces had become by 1761.

Prince Thepphiphit, who had earlier been exiled to Sri Lanka after his failed rebellion in 1758, became involved in political conflicts in Sri Lanka. The Dutch conspired with native Sinhalese nobles, including the monks of Siam Nikaya sect, to assassinate King Kirti Sri Rajasinha of Kandy and to replace him with the Siamese prince Thepphiphit in 1760. However, Kirti Sri Rajasinha became aware of the plot and drove Thepphiphit out of Sri Lanka. Thepphiphit ended up returning to Siam, arriving at the port of Mergui in 1762. Ekkathat was shocked and enraged at the return of his fugitive half-brother and ordered his confinement in Tenasserim.

Dutch–Siamese relations had been in deterioration state due to Dutch trade in Siam being unprofitable and the Siamese court forcing the Dutch to pay Recognitiegelden or procession fees to Siamese trade officials. The Dutch outright closed their factories at Ayutthaya, Ligor and left Siam in 1741. However, the Dutch decided to return and resume their trading post in Siam in 1748 for fear that the British would arrive and take over. During this low ebb of Dutch–Siamese relations, the British stepped in. In 1762, George Pigot the governor of Madras and President of East India Company sent a British merchant William Powney (known in Thai chronicles as "Alangkapuni") to Ayutthaya in order to renew relation with Siam. Powney presented King Ekkathat with a lion, an Arabian horse, an ostrich and proposed to establish a British outpost in Mergui.

In late 1763, a Burmese governor named Udaungza rose up and seized power in Tavoy, killing the Konbaung-appointed Tavoy governor. Udaungza then proclaimed himself the governor of Tavoy and sent tributes to submit to Siam. Tavoy and Tenasserim Coast returned to Siamese rule again after this incident.

== Burmese conquests of Lanna and Laos ==
=== Burmese conquest of Lanna (1763) ===
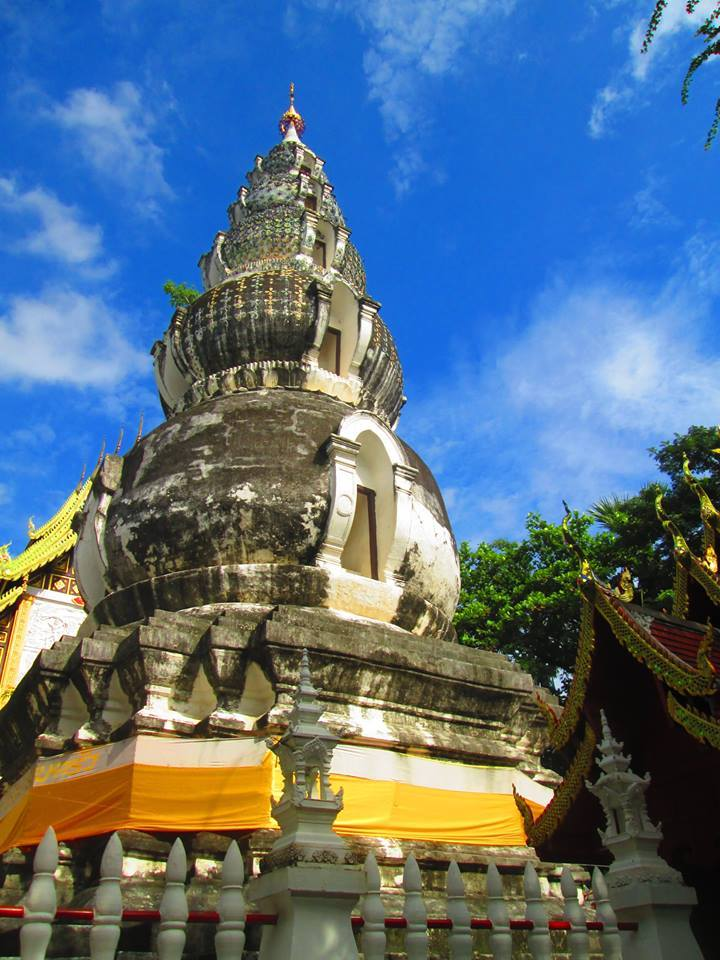
Wat Kutao to the north of Chiang Mai was the place where Burmese forces encamped during the Burmese siege and capture of Chiang Mai in 1762–1763.

After the Burmese conquest of Lanna in 1558, Lanna or modern Northern Thailand had been mostly under Burmese rule. At the time when the Burmese Toungoo dynasty became weak, Ong Kham, the former Tai Lue king of Luang Prabang, expelled the Burmese from Chiang Mai in 1727 and made himself the King of Chiang Mai as an independent sovereign. Burma lost control over the region but Lanna became fragmented into individual princedoms. Upon victory of Alaungpaya over the Mons in 1757, Northern Thai Lanna rulers of Chiang Saen, Kengtung, Phrae and Nan sent congratulatory tributes to Alaungpaya at Pegu but Chiang Mai remained defiant, not sending tributes and Burma was yet to take actual control over Lanna. Alaungpaya still had to declare his intention to conquer Chiang Mai in September 1759 because Chiang Mai was not yet under Burmese control by then.

Ong Kham of Chiang Mai died 1759, to be succeeded by his son Ong Chan. However, Ong Chan was deposed by his brother in 1761 who gave the throne to a Buddhist monk instead. In 1762, King Naungdawgyi of Burma recalled that the fifty-seven towns of Lanna used to be under Burmese suzerainty and sought to bring Lanna back under Burmese control. Naungdawgyi sent Burmese army under Abaya Kamani, with Minhla Thiri (later Maha Nawrahta) as second-in-command, with the forces of 7,500 men to conquer Chiang Mai in October 1762. Abaya Kamani reached Chiang Mai in December, taking position at Wat Kutao and laying siege on Chiang Mai. Chiang Mai requested supports from King Ekkathat of Ayutthaya. Chiang Mai persisted many months until August 1763 when Chiang Mai fell to the Burmese invaders. Ekkathat sent Chaophraya Phitsanulok Rueang the governor of Phitsanulok to bring Siamese forces to rescue Chiang Mai but he was too late as Chiang Mai had already fallen to the Burmese so the Siamese turned back.

King Naungdawgyi died in December 1763 and was succeeded by his brother the Myedu Prince who became King Hsinbyushin. Abaya Kamani deported nearly the whole Northern Thai population of Chiang Mai, including the former king Ong Chan and Smim Htaw the former king of Pegu, to Burma in 1764. The new king Hsinbyushin appointed Abaya Kamani to be the Myowun or Burmese governor of Chiang Mai and elevated Minhla Thiri to become Maha Nawrahta the Myinwun or Commander of Cavalry. However, Lanna soon broke out in rebellion against Burma in 1764 under leaderships of Saen Khwang in Phayao and Nwe Mano in Lamphun. Hsinbyushin was determined to complete the unfinished mission of his father Alaungpaya in the conquest of Siam so initiated a grand campaign to accomplish his goal in 1764. He sent 20,000-men-strong army, under the command of Nemyo Thihapate, the Burmese commander who had a Lao (Lanna) mother according to a Thai chronicle composed in 1795, to conquer Lanna, Laos and then went on to conquer Siam. Nemyo Thihapate left for Lanna in February 1764, defeating Saen Khwang near Chiang Saen and Nwe Mano at Lamphun. Nemyo Thihapate also took Lampang, installing Chaikaew (father of Kawila) as the ruler of Lampang. After pacifying Lanna, as the rainy season arrived, Nemyo Thihapate and his Burmese forces rested and sheltered at Nan.

=== Burmese conquest of Laos (1765) ===
Since early eighteenth century, the Lao kingdom of Lanxang had fragmented into three separate kingdoms of Luang Prabang, Vientiane and Champasak. Lao kingdoms of Luang Prabang and Vientiane had been engaging in political rivalry. In October 1764, King Ong Boun of Vientiane wrote a letter to King Hsinbyushin, urging the Burmese to invade his rival Luang Prabang. After sheltering for wet season at Nan in 1764, Nemyo Thihapate and his Burmese army set off to conquer Luang Prabang. The Burmese left Nan in November 1764 to reach Luang Prabang. King Sotikakumman of Luang Prabang and his brother Prince Surinyavong led Lao army of 50,000 men to face the Burmese on the banks of Mekong. However, in the Battle of Mekong, the Lao were soundly defeated and had to retreat into the city. Nemyo Thihapate reminded his soldiers that the goal of this campaign was not only to conquer Lanna and Laos but also to conquer Ayutthaya so they should not waste much time and should take Luang Prabang with urgency. Luang Prabang fell to the Burmese in March 1765. Sotikakumman had to give away his daughter, other Lao noblewomen and servants to the Burmese court. His brother Surinyawong was also captured as prisoner-of-war and hostage.

After the Burmese victory at Luang Prabang, King Ong Boun of Vientiane submitted his kingdom to Burmese rule. The Lao kingdoms of Luang Prabang and Vientiane (not including the Kingdom of Champasak) then became Burmese vassals in 1765 and would remain so until the Siamese conquest of Laos in 1778–1779. After the Luang Prabang campaign, Nemyo Thihapate and his army went to pacify Kengtung and then took the wet season shelter at Lampang, contemplating the invasion of Siam by the end of that year.

== Burmese preparations ==
=== Cause of the war ===
At his ascension in 1764, the new Burmese king Hsinbyushin was determined to accomplish the unfinished mission of his father King Alaungpaya to conquer Ayutthaya. Hsinbyushin had wanted to continue the war with Siam since the end of the last war. The Burmese–Siamese War (1765–1767) was the continuation of the war of 1759–1760, the casus belli of which was a dispute over the control of the Tenasserim coast and its trade, and Siamese support for ethnic Mon rebels of the fallen restored Hanthawaddy Kingdom of Lower Burma. The 1760 war, which claimed the life of the dynasty founder King Alaungpaya, was inconclusive. Although Burma regained control of the upper Tenasserim coast to Tavoy, it achieved none of its other objectives. In the Burmese south, the Siamese readily provided shelter to the defeated ethnic Mon rebels.

=== Burmese strategy ===
As the deputy commander-in-chief in the 1760 war, Hsinbyushin used his firsthand experience to plan the next invasion. His general plan called for a pincer movement on the Siamese capital from the north and the south. The Burmese battle plan was greatly shaped by their experience in the 1759–1760 war. First, they would avoid a single pronged attack route along the narrow Gulf of Siam coastline, which they discovered could easily be clogged up by more numerous Siamese forces. In 1760, the Burmese were forced to spend nearly three months (January–March) fighting their way out of the coastline. This time, they planned a multi-pronged attack from all sides to stretch out the numerically superior Siamese defenses.

Secondly, they would start the invasion early to maximize the dry-season campaign period. In the previous war, Alaungpaya started the invasion too late (in late December 1759/early January 1760). When the Burmese finally reached Ayutthaya in mid-April, they only had a little over a month left before the rainy season to take the city. This time, they elected to begin the invasion at the height of the rainy season. By starting the invasion early, the Burmese hoped their armies would be within a striking distance from Ayutthaya at the beginning of the dry season.

=== Burmese preparations ===
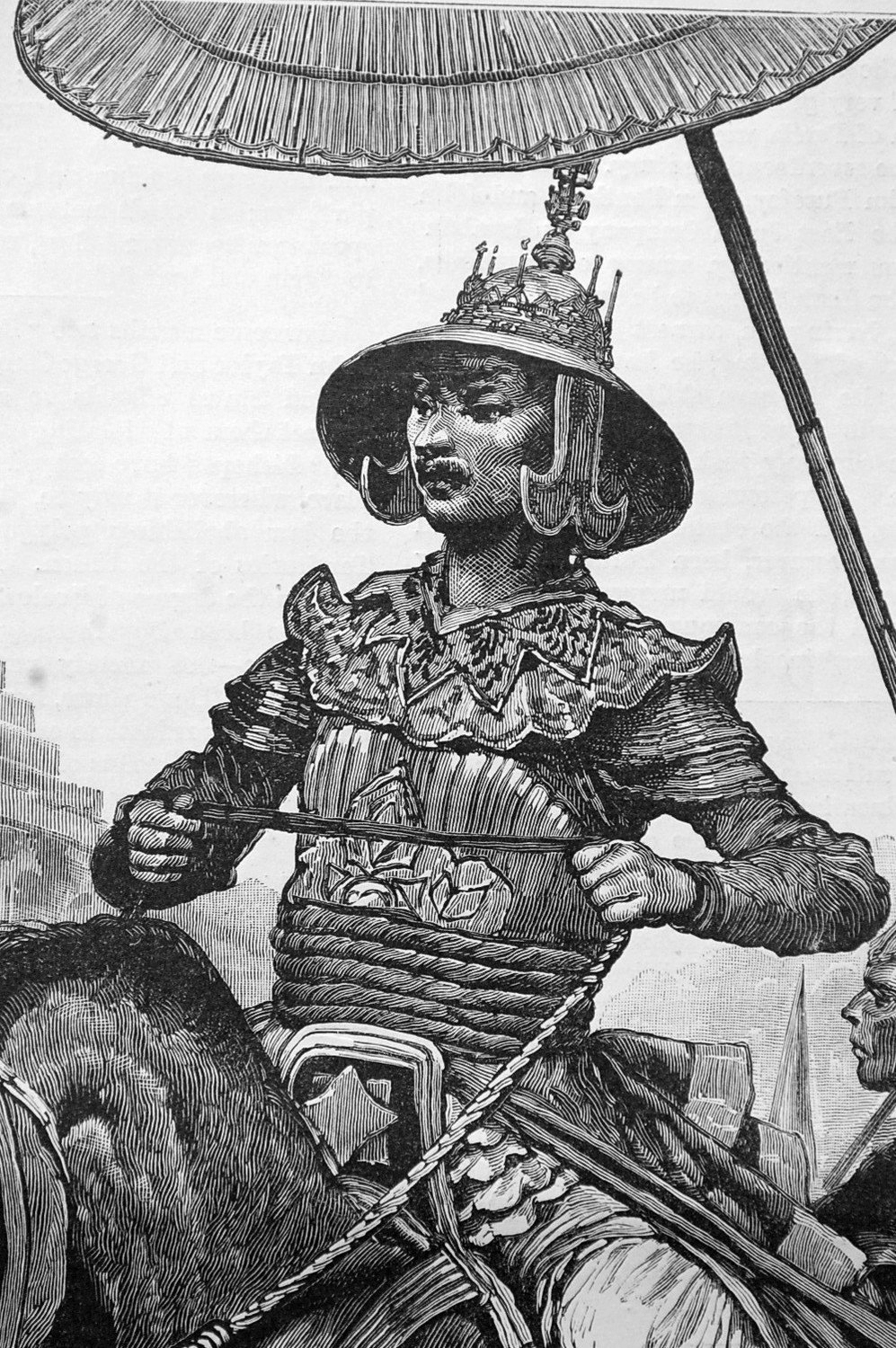
Burmese general

After sending Nemyo Thihapate to Lanna in late 1764, Hsinbyushin dispatched another army of 20,000 men led by Maha Nawrahta, the Myinwun or Commander of Cavalry, to Tavoy in December 1764 (8th waxing of Nadaw 1126 ME), with Nemyo Gonnarat and Tuyin Yanaunggyaw as seconds-in-command and with Metkya Bo and Teingya Minkhaung as vanguard. The Burmese artillery corps was led by a group of about 200 French soldiers who were captured in the Battle of Syriam in 1756 during the Burmese civil war of 1752–1757.

After sending off his armies to attack Ayutthaya, King Hsinbyushin himself led the Burmese forces to attack Manipur in January 1765. King Chingthang Khomba or King Jaisingh of Manipur marched out to face the Burmese king in the Battle of Kakching in February but the Burmese prevailed, prompting the Manipur monarch to flee to Cachar, asking for aid from the Ahom kingdom. Hsinbyushin stayed in Manipur for about a month until his return to Burma as he appointed Prince Moirang, uncle and political enemy of Jaisingh, to be the puppet king of Manipur under Burmese domination. Hsinbyushin deported a great number of Meitei people back to Burma, recruiting Meitei horsemen as Cassay Horse units serving the Burmese army. Upon returning to Burma, Hsinbyushin realized that his royal capital of Shwebo, located at the northwestern corner of Burma, was unsuitable for governance so he moved the royal capital to Ava on 1 April 1765 (11th waxing of Tagu, 1127 ME).

Burmese conquests of Lanna and Laos in 1762–1765 allowed Burma to access food and manpower resources that were later proven to be crucial to the Ayutthaya campaign. Ne Myo Thihapate was ordered to raise an army from the Shan States throughout 1764. By November, Ne Myo Thihapate commanded a 20,000-strong army at Kengtung, preparing to leave for Chiang Mai. As was customary, the Shan regiments were led by their own saophas (chiefs). (Not everyone was happy about the Burmese army's conscription drive, however. Some of the saophas of northern Shan states, which at the time paid dual tribute to Burma and China, fled to China, and complained to the Chinese emperor). Nemyo Thihapate rested his armies in Lampang for the rainy season of 1765, preparing for the upcoming invasion of Siam.

== Burmese invasion of Western Siam ==
=== Burmese conquest of Tenasserim ===
Tenasserim Coast came under Siamese domination again in late 1763 due to defection of Udaungza, the self-proclaimed governor of Tavoy. Maha Nawrahta and his armies left Burma in December 1764, reaching Martaban. Maha Nawrahta sent his vanguard of 5,000 men to take Tavoy in January 1765. Udaungza took refuge in Mergui. Maha Nawrahta sent a ship to Mergui, asking for the surrender of Udaungza. When Siamese authorities did not comply, Maha Nawrahta then quickly took Mergui and Tenasserim on 11 January 1765, massacring the population who failed to escape. Ayutthaya received the news of the Burmese conquest of Tenasserim with consternation as the royal court prepared for the defense of the capital.

In April 1765, King Hsinbyushin moved his royal seat to Ava, the traditional Burmese capital. He also reinforced Maha Nawrahta with additional forces of 10,000 men including;

- Pegu regiment; 3,000 men, under Einda Yaza
- Martaban regiment; 3,000 men, under Binnya Sein

including the newly-recruited forces from Tenasserim;

- Tavoy regiment; 2,000 men, under the governor of Martaban
- Mergui and Tenasserim regiment; 2,000 men, under Lakyawdin

This, combined with the original number of 20,000 men, made the total forces of 30,000 men under Maha Nawrahta. The Burmese army had now mobilized 50,000 men, including those in Lanna. (This likely represented the largest mobilization of the Burmese army since Bayinnaung's 1568–1569 invasion.)

=== Burmese invasion of Western Siam ===
Thai, French and Dutch sources state that the Burmese forces invaded Western Siam in early 1765. Udaungza the fugitive former governor of Tavoy fled from Tenasserim down south to Kra Isthmus to Kraburi. The Burmese were keen on chasing after Udaungza and then followed Udaungza to Kraburi, burning down the town. The Tavoy governor fled further to Phetchaburi, where Prince Thepphiphit also took refuge. The Burmese forces sacked and burnt down the Siamese towns of Chumphon, Pathio, Kuiburi and Pranburi on the way and then returned to Tavoy via the Singkhon Pass.

King Ekkathat arranged for Prince Thepphiphit to be grounded in Chanthaburi and Udaungza to reside in Chonburi on Eastern Siamese Coast. The Siamese king then sent out forces to halt Burmese advances;

- Chaophraya Phrakhlang the Samuha Nayok or Prime Minister, accompanied by Phraya Yommaraj and Phraya Tak, led the forces of 15,000 men including armored elephants and mounted cannons to deal with the Burmese at Phetchaburi and Ratchaburi.
- Chaophraya Nakhon Si Thammarat the governor of Nakhon Si Thammarat (Ligor) led Southern Siamese forces to defend the Singkhon Pass against possible Burmese incursion from Tenasserim.
- Phraya Kalahom the Samuha Kalahom of Minister of Military, led Siamese forces to the Three Pagodas Pass, where the Burmese did not come, showing the inaccuracy of the Siamese intelligence system.
- Phraya Phetchaburi Rueang the governor of Phetchaburi, led the Siamese army north to Sawankhalok to defend against the Burmese invasion from Lanna.
- Phra Phirenthorathep stationed his troops at Kanchanaburi.

In May 1765, Maha Nawrahta at Tavoy sent his vanguard forces of 5,000 men under Metkya Bo and Teingya Minkhaung, passing through the Myitta Pass to attack Kanchanaburi. Phra Phirenthorathep at Kanchanaburi, with his 3,000 men, was defeated and retreated. The Burmese vanguard then quickly conquered Western Siamese cities. By this point, the Ayutthayan royal government had lost any control over its peripheral cities, which were left at the mercy of the Burmese. The Burmese invaders took a reconciliatory approach to these outlying Siamese towns. Towns that brought no resistance were spared from destruction and surrendered Siamese leaders were made to swear loyalty. Any cities that resisted and took up arms against Burmese invaders would face military punishment and subjugation.

The main Siamese forces of Chaophraya Phrakhlang met with the Burmese vanguard at Ratchaburi, leading to the Battle of Ratchaburi. The Siamese in Ratchaburi resisted for many days. Siamese elephant mahouts intoxicated their elephants with alcohol in order to make them more aggressive, but one day this intoxication went too far as the elephants became uncontrollable, leading to Siamese defeat and Burmese capture of Ratchaburi. Western Siamese towns of Ratchaburi, Phetchaburi, Kanchanaburi and Chaiya all fell to the Burmese. Siamese people in these fallen cities fled into the jungles in large numbers as they were hunted down and captured by the invaders.

After conquering Western Siam, the Burmese vanguard encamped at Kanchanaburi in modern Tha Maka district where the two rivers (Khwae Yai and Khwae Noi) met, while Maha Nawrahta himself was still in Tavoy. Maha Nawrahta also organized Western Siamese captives from Phetchaburi, Ratchaburi, Kanchanaburi, Suphanburi, Chaiya and Chumphon into regiments placed under the rearguard of Mingyi Kamani Sanda, the Wun of Pakhan. French and Dutch sources stated that all cities to the west of Ayutthaya had fallen under Burmese control by early 1765. Abraham Werndlij, the new Dutch opperhoofd of Ayutthaya, expressed his concerns that Siam was unable to do anything and left the Burmese to occupy Western Siam, which was the source of Dutch commodities including sappanwood and tin.

The main reason for the quick fall of Kanchanaburi could be that the Burmese were battle-hardened. But it could also be that the Siamese command miscalculated where the Burmese main attack would come from, and had not sufficiently reinforced the fort to withstand a major attack. Judging by the Siamese chronicles' reporting of the main attack route, the Siamese command appeared to have believed that the main Burmese attack would come from the Gulf of Siam coastline, instead of the most obvious and shortest route via Kanchanaburi. The Siamese sources say that Maha Nawrahta's main invasion route came from southern Tenasserim, crossing the Tenasserim range at Chumphon and Phetchaburi. The path is totally different from the Kanchanaburi route reported by the Burmese chronicles. Historian Kyaw Thet specifically adds that the main attack route was via the Myitta Pass.

The Chumphon route is unlikely to have been the main attack route as it was even farther south than Alaungpaya's Kui Buri route. It means the Burmese would have had a longer route to go back up the Gulf of Siam coast. Without the element of surprise that Alaungpaya enjoyed in the 1760 war, the Burmese invasion force of 1765 would have had to fight more than three months it took Alaungpaya to break away from the coast. Yet, Maha Nawrahta's army was west of Ayutthaya by December. To be sure, the smaller Burmese army that took Tenasserim could have crossed over at Chumphon, and marched up the coast although the most southerly battles reported by the Burmese were at Ratchaburi and Phetchaburi, on the northern coast. At any rate, according to the Burmese sources, Chumphon was not the main attack route

=== Siamese preparations ===
As the Burmese had occupied all of Western Siam by early 1765 encamping at Kanchanaburi, King Ekkathat organized Siamese forces of 15,000 to 16,000 men to spread out to defend against Burmese invaders in June 1765;

- Chaophraya Nakhon Si Thammarat, the governor of Ligor (which was the principal city of Southern Siam), stationed his Southern Siamese troops of 1,000 men at Bang Bamru just to the south of Burmese-occupied Ratchaburi.
- Chaophraya Phitsanulok Rueang, the governor of Phitsanulok (which was the principal city of Northern Siam), took position of his Northern Siamese forces at Wat Phukhaothong temple to the northwest of Ayutthaya.
- Phraya Nakhon Ratchasima, the governor of Nakhon Ratchasima, led his Khorat troops to take position at Wat Chedi Daeng temple to the north of Ayutthaya.
- Phraya Rattanathibet, the Minister of Palace Affairs, led the Khorat forces of 4,000 men to take position at Thonburi to the south of Ayutthaya to prevent Burmese riverine advances through the Chao Phraya River. An iron chain was erected across the river to obstruct the Burmese fleet.
- Phraya Yommaraj, the Head of Police Bureau, with 2,000 men stationed at Nonthaburi.

== Wet Season Campaign (August–October 1765) ==
=== Southern Front: Battle of Thonburi ===
By mid-1765, Maha Nawrahta the commander of the Burmese Tavoy column had still been in Tavoy, while his vanguard had already encamping at Kanchanaburi. In August 1765, the Burmese vanguard at Kanchanaburi, led by Metkya Bo, attacked and repelled the Southern Siamese forces under the governor of Ligor at Bang Bamru. Suffering the defeat, the Ligor governor was then charged with incompetency, arrested and imprisoned in Ayutthaya. Metkya Bo and Teingya Minkhaung led their Burmese vanguard to proceed to attack Thonburi. The panicked Siamese commander Phraya Rattanathibet abandoned his position and retreated with his Khorat regiment technically dispersed. The Burmese vanguard seized the French-constructed Wichaiyen Fort at Bangkok. French Catholic seminary and Dutch trade factory at Thonburi were also burnt down and destroyed. After successful capture of Thonburi, the Burmese vanguard then returned to the position at Kanchanaburi.

=== Northern Front: Burmese invasion of Northern Siam ===
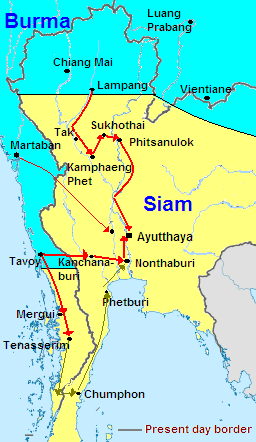
Battle map of the war (Aug 1765 – Jan 1766) Burmese territory Siamese territory

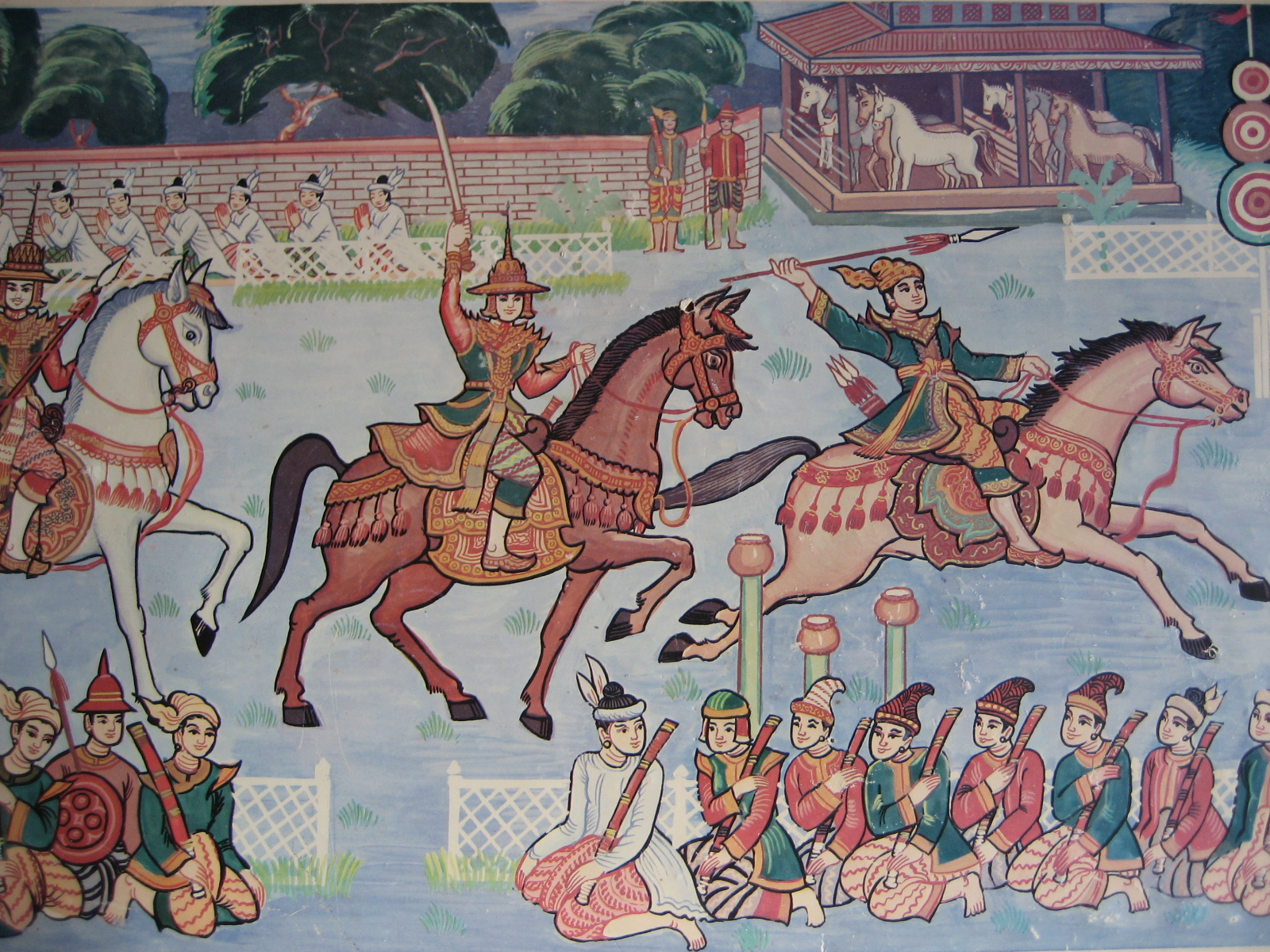
Burmese cavalry

After subjugating Lanna and Laos, Nemyo Thihapate and his Burmese forces took rainy season shelter in Lampang. Conquest of Lanna and Laos allowed the Burmese to access vast manpower and other resources to be utilized in their invasion of Siam from the north. In mid-1765, Nemyo Thihapate recruited local Lanna and Lao men into regiments, adding to the total of 43,000 men, 400 elephants, 1,200 horses and 300 riverine vessels alongside the existing Burmese forces;

- The Lanna (Yun) regiments, under the command of Thado Mindin (who later became the Burmese governor of Chiang Mai in 1769), composing of 12,000 men, 200 elephants and 700 horses, were recruited from Chiang Mai, Lampang, Lamphun, Chiang Saen, Nan, Phrae, Chiang Rai, Phayao, Chiang Khong, Mong Hsat, Mongpu, Kenglat and Mongnai.
- The Lanxang (Linzin) regiments, under the command of Thiri Yazathingyan, composing of 8,000 men, 100 elephants and 300 horses, were recruited from Luang Prabang, Vientiane, Muang La, Mong Yawng and Mong Hang.
- Burmese riparian fleet, composing of 10,000 men and 300 boats under leadership of Tuyin Yamagyaw.

Nemyo Thihapate and his Burmese-Lanna-Lao forces left Lampang on 23 August 1765 (8th waxing of Tawthalin 1127 ME) at the height of the rainy season down the Wang River to attack Hua Mueang Nuea or Northern Siam. The reason for the earlier start of the northern army was that it was much farther away from Ayutthaya than its southern counterparts. Still the strategy did not work as planned. Like Maha Nawrahta, Nemyo Thihapate sent his vanguard forces of 5,000 men under Satpagyon Bo to do the initial conquests. Satpagyon Bo met Phraya Phetchaburi Rueang the commander of northern Siamese defense forces at Sawankhalok, leading to the Battle of Sawankhalok. Sawankhalok resisted for many days but was eventually conquered by the Burmese commander Satpagyon Bo and Phraya Phetchaburi Rueang had to retreat south to Chainat.

Siamese initial defeat at Sawankhalok left the whole Northern Siam vulnerable to Burmese conquests. After Sawankhalok, Satpagyon Bo attacked Sukhothai and Tak, where the governor Phraya Tak was called to Ayutthaya leaving little defense to the town. Tak offered resistance but eventually fell to the Burmese commander Satpagyon Bo. After Tak, Satpagyon Bo proceeded to attack Kamphaeng Phet, which offered no resistances. Burmese invading forces in the northern front implemented in the same policy as in the southwestern front in regard to peripheral Siamese cities, in which the cities that surrendered would be spared from destruction but any cities that resisted would face punishment. The northern army's advance was greatly slowed by the rainy weather and the "petty chiefs" who put up a fight, forcing Thihapate to storm town after town. Nonetheless, the Burmese vangaurd fought the way down the Wang, finally taking Tak and Kamphaeng Phet by the end of the rainy season.

== Dry Season Campaign (October 1765 – January 1766) ==
=== Southern Front: Battle of Nonthaburi ===
Maha Nawrahta himself marched his main forces from Tavoy to Kanchanaburi, leaving Tavoy on 23 October 1765 (10th waxing of Tazaungmon 1127 ME) in three directions. He had 20,000 to 30,000 under his command. (The Burmese sources say 30,000 men including 2000 horses and 200 elephants but G E Harvey gives the actual invasion force as 20,000. At least part of the difference could be explained by the rearguard who stayed behind to defend the Tenasserim coast). A small army invaded by the Three Pagodas Pass towards Suphan Buri. Another small army invaded down the Tenasserim coast towards Mergui (Myeik) and Tenasserim (Tanintharyi) town. However, the main thrust of his attack was at Kanchanaburi. His 20,000-strong main southern army invaded via the Myitta Pass. (It was also the same route the Japanese used in 1942 to invade Burma from Thailand.) Kanchanaburi fell with little resistance.

In 1765, the British trader William Powney (called Alangkapuni in Thai sources) sailed his merchant ship to Ayutthaya, bringing Indian textiles to sell. However, his business was unsuccessful apparently because Siam had been in the middle of warfare and no one was bothered to buy luxurious goods. Powney instead was caught in the indigenous warfare as King Ekkathat, through his minister Chaophraya Phrakhlang, requested for the aid from Powney to defend against the Burmese invasion, in which Powney agreed on conditions that the Siamese court should provide him with adequate resources. Powney then sailed downstream from Ayutthaya and anchored his brigantine at Thonburi to halt Burmese advances. Abraham Werndlij, the Dutch opperhoofd, was very concerned about the prospect that Ayutthaya royal city would again be attacked by the Burmese, as fresh memory of the death of the previous opperhoofd in 1760 and the loss of commodity goods were still looming. In October 1765, a Dutch diplomatic ship arrived in Ayutthaya from Batavia, giving instructions to Werndlij to secretly close down and abandon the Dutch factory in Ayutthaya to escape Burmese attacks. Werndlij, with the ship carrying as many Dutch goods as possible, hurriedly left Ayutthaya on 28 October. After resting at the mouth of Chao Phraya River, Werndlij and his Dutch ship left Siam in early November 1765, ending Ayutthaya–Dutch relations.

In December 1765, Maha Nawrahta at Kanchanaburi sent his vanguard under Metkya Bo to occupy Thonburi again, reaching Thonburi on 24 December. Metkya Bo took position at the Wichayen Fort in Bangkok, mounting his cannon to fire on Powney's brigantine warship at Thonburi, prompting Powney to retreat to Nonthaburi. The Siamese commander Phraya Yommaraj at Nonthaburi abandoned his position and retreated in panic, leaving Powney alone to fight the Burmese. Metkya Bo then proceeded to take position and encamp at Wat Khema Phitaram temple in Nonthaburi, about 60 km south of Ayutthaya, on both banks of the Chao Phraya River. Powney requested for more firearms and ammunition from the Siamese royal court. Ayutthayan court agreed to send supplies but Powney had to deposit his trade goods in the Phra Klang Sinkha or Royal Warehouse in exchange – the condition that Powney only reluctantly complied.

The Burmese finally faced a serious Siamese defensive line guarding the route to the capital. On one night, Powney and his Siamese allies sailed down to make a joint land-naval attack on the Burmese garrison at Nonthaburi by surprise, leading to the Battle of Nonthaburi in December 1765 – the first major battle of the southern theatre. The Burmese suffered losses but also feigned retreat. The unsuspecting Siamese soldiers along with a number of British traders entered Nonthaburi without caution, where they were ambushed and routed by the Burmese. The Burmese put the severed head of a British supercargo on a pike for display. Defeated, Powney pressed for more guns, boats and personnel from Ayutthaya through Chaophraya Phrakhlang but this time his demands were not met due to the Siamese court being low in resources and did not fully trust Powney. Powney was dissatisfied about Siam not complying to his demands so he decided to turn against Siam. Powney abandoned his position and eventually left Siam, leaving his cargo behind in Ayutthaya and plundering six Chinese–Siamese junks on the way.

=== Northern Front: Battle of Sukhothai ===
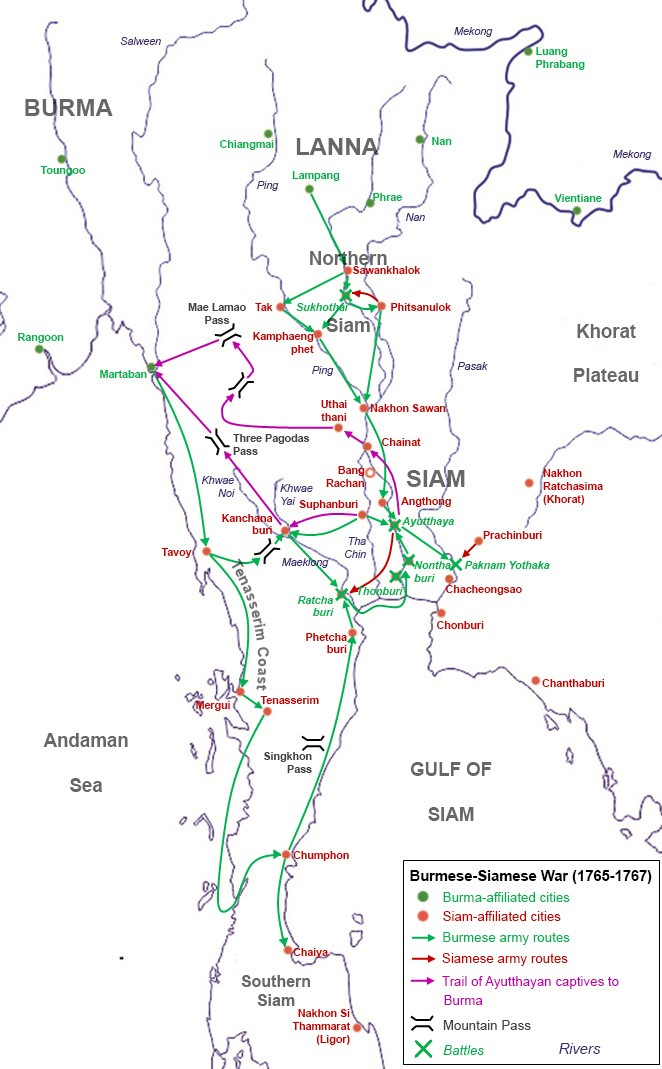
Burmese Invasion of Siam in 1765–1767, leading to the Fall of Ayutthaya; Green represents the Burmese. Magenta shows the trail of Ayutthayan captives being deported to Burma.

Chaophraya Phitsanulok Rueang, who had been in command of Northern Siamese regiment at Wat Phukhaothong temple in Ayutthaya, in the middle of warfare, gained permission from King Ekkathat to return to Phitsanulok to attend his mother's funeral, leaving his subordinate Luang Kosa to be in charge. In October 1765, the Burmese vanguard under Satpagyon Bo attacked Sukhothai and took the city. The Siamese had to initially abandon their city and returned to lay siege on the Burmese-occupied Sukhothai, leading to the Battle of Sukhothai. Chaophraya Phitsanulok brought forces from his base in Phitsanulok to participate in the siege of Sukhothai.

In November 1765, Prince Chaofa Chit, who had been a political prisoner inside of the Ayutthayan palace, broke free and went to visit Uthumphon the temple king at Wat Pradu Songtham temple with the help of Luang Kosa of Phitsanulok. This political incident put the Siamese royal court in commotion. Luang Kosa then took Prince Chit north to Phitsanulok, where Chaophraya Phitsanulok the governor was absent and away fighting the Burmese at Sukhothai. Prince Chit then decided to seize power and establish himself in Phitsanulok, fortifying himself against King Ekkathat. Lady Chuengchiang, wife of Chaophraya Phitsanulok, escaped in a small boat to inform her husband at Sukhothai about the coup of Prince Chit in Phitsanulok. Chaophraya Phitsanulok was so enraged that he decided to abandon his campaign in Sukhothai and returned to Phitsanulok, bringing his forces to subjugate Prince Chit. Battle ensued between Chaophraya Phitsanulok and Prince Chit in Phitsanulok and this distraction allowed the Burmese to proceed. Eventually, Chaophraya Phitsanulok was able to retake his city, capturing the fugitive Prince Chit. Chaophraya Phitsanulok then had Prince Chit executed by drowning.

Ne Myo Thihapate's northern army was stuck in northern Siam although the pace of his advance had improved considerably since the end of the rainy season. After taking Kamphaeng Phet, Thihapate turned northeast, and captured the main northern cities of Sukhothai and Phitsanulok. Burmese chronicles states that the Burmese army took Phitsanulok by force, occupying Phitsanulok as the base for months. However, Thai chronicles describes that Nemyo Thihapate went directly from Sukhothai to Kamphaeng Phet in January 1766 without taking Phitsanulok, presuming that Chaophraya Phitsanulok retained his position in Phitsanulok as he would later survive to become one of the regional regime leaders after the Fall of Ayutthaya. At Phitsanulok, Nemyo Thihapate paused to refill the ranks because in about 4 months, he had already lost many men to the grueling campaign and to "preventable diseases". The local chiefs were made to drink the water of allegiance and provide conscripts to the Burmese army. (Outside Ayutthaya, Maha Nawrahta too was collecting local levies.)

While the Burmese refilled their ranks, the Siamese command belatedly sent another army to retake Phitsanulok. But the Siamese army was driven back with heavy losses. It was the last major stand by the Siamese in the north. The Siamese defense collapsed afterwards. Nemyo Thihapate sent his two commanders Thiri Nanda Thingyan and Kyawgaung Kyawthu to finish up the remaining Northern Siamese towns of Phichai, Phichit, Nakhon Sawan and Ang Thong. The Burmese army moved by boat down the Nan River, taking Phichai, Phichit, Nakhon Sawan, and down the Chao Phraya, taking Ang Thong. Captured Siamese cannons and firearms were sent to Burmese-held Chiang Mai to be stocked. Nemyo Thihapate also organized Northern Siamese men from Tak, Kamphaeng Phet, Sawankhalok, Sukhothai, Phitsanulok, Phichai, Phichit, Nakhon Sawan and Ang Thong into new regiments under the vanguard command of Nanda Udein Kyawdin.

=== Western Front: Battle of Siguk ===
In early 1766, King Ekkathat sent Phraya Phollathep the Minister of Agriculture to lead Siamese forces, which the Burmese chronicles describes as having up to 60,000 men with 500 elephants and 500 cannons, to station at Siguk (Thigok in Burmese, in modern Nam Tao, Bang Ban, Ayutthaya) about ten kilometers to the west of Ayutthaya.

Maha Nawrahta at Kanchanaburi proceeded towards Ayutthaya in January 1766, dividing his armies into two routes;

- The first route, the land armies taken by Maha Nawrahta himself, would march through Suphanburi to approach Ayutthaya from the west.
- The second route, the riparian fleet led by Mingyi Kamani Sanda, sailed through Thonburi and Nonthaburi on the Chao Phraya River, approaching Ayutthaya from the south.

Maha Nawrahta and his main forces met the Siamese force of 60,000 men under the command of Chaophraya Phollathep at Siguk to the west of Ayutthaya, leading to the Battle of Siguk. Outnumbered 3 to 1, the more experienced Burmese army nonetheless routed the much larger Siamese army, which according to the Burmese, was "chopped to pieces", forcing the remaining Siamese troops to retreat to the capital. Maha Nawrahta had now arrived at Ayutthaya as planned, in record time. ("It took Alaungpaya's 40,000 men about three and a half months to arrive at Ayutthaya in 1760 whereas it took Maha Nawrahta's 20,000 plus army just about two months"). But he pulled back to the northwest of the city because he did not see Thihapate's northern army, and because he did not want to take on another major battle with his depleted army. He used the hiatus to refill the ranks with Siamese conscripts.

=== Burmese Approach onto Ayutthaya ===
Mingyi Kamani Sanda and his fleet proceeded through the Chao Phraya River and took position at Bangsai (in modern Bang Pa-in district), about five kilometers to the south of Ayutthaya where the main Ayutthayan waterway checkpoint stood. After the victorious Battle of Siguk, Maha Nawrahta informed King Hsinbyushin at Ava that he had conquered all cities to the west of Ayutthaya and had already taken position in the outskirts of Ayutthaya, waiting for Nemyo Thihapate to join from the north. King Hsinbyushin appointed Mingyi Manya to be the new governor of Tavoy to replace Udaungza, signifying long-term Burmese control of Tavoy. The Burmese king also sent a Mon regiment of 2,000 men under the command of Binnya Sein to join as an additional force. From Ang Thong, Nemyo Thihapate marched his army through the old route of Chao Phraya River that would become modern Khlong Bangkaeo canal from Ang Thong to Ayutthaya (Old route of Chao Phraya River was inadvertently diverted through a digging of a new canal from Ang Thong to Pamok. The old route gradually dried out in favor of the new route and became a smaller Bang Kaeo canal by Early Bangkok Period.). Nemyo Thihapate reached the environs of Ayutthaya on 20 January 1766 (5th waxing of Tabodwe 1127 ME), making contact with Maha Nawrahta's army. Nemyo Thihapate took position at Paknam Prasop (Panan Pathok in Burmese, modern Bang Pahan district), about seven kilometers to the north of Ayutthaya.

By January 1766, all of the main Burmese forces, including both Tavoy and Chiang Mai columns, approached Ayutthaya in three directions;

- Nemyo Thihapate, with his Burmese-Lanna-Lao forces of 20,000 men, encamped at Paknam Prasop to the north of Ayutthaya.
- Maha Nawrahta, with his 20,000–30,000 men, encamped at Siguk to the west of Ayutthaya.
- Mingyi Kamani Sanda stationed his fleet at Bangsai to the south of Ayutthaya, under the command of Maha Nawrahta. He was joined by the Mon regiment of Binnya Sein.

== Battle at the outskirts (January 1766) ==
=== Northern Front: Battle of Paknam Prasop ===
In January 1766, when the main Burmese Chiang Mai column of Nemyo Thihapate was approaching Ayutthaya via the old route of Chao Phraya River, King Ekkathat sent Siamese armies, both by land and rivers, under Chaophraya Phrakhlang the Prime Minister with 10,000 men (50,000 men according to Burmese chronicles) to halt the advancing Burmese at Paknam Prasop (Panan Pathok in Burmese) to the north of Ayutthaya. Nemyo Thihapate met the Siamese armies at about two and a quarter miles northwest from Paknam Prasop on the Lopburi River, leading to the Battle of Paknam Prasop in January 1766. Thai chronicles emphasized the undisciplined ineffectiveness of Siamese military. Nemyo Thihapate totally defeated the Siamese armies of Phrakhlang in this battle, inflicting heavy casualties and losses on Siamese side. Phrakhlang and the remaining of his armies retreated into Ayutthaya. Nemyo Thihapate was then able to proceed and establish himself at Paknam Prasop to the north of Ayutthaya. 1,000 Siamese soldiers, 200 elephants, 500 guns and 300 small boats were captured by the Burmese.

Three days after the first Siamese defeat at Paknam Prasop, King Ekkathat sent another army under Chaophraya Phrakhlang with 10,000 men in a new attempt to dislodge the Burmese from Paknam Prasop in January 1766. This time, a number of Ayutthayan city dwellers even followed the Siamese armies to the battle only to watch the Burmese-Siamese battle out of curiosity. Nemyo Thihapate led his Burmese army of 10,000 men, 100 elephants and 1,000 horses to engage with the Siamese. According to Thai chronicles, Nemyo Thihapate lured the Siamese into thinking that he was going to retreat. The unsuspecting Siamese charged directly into Burmese standing at Paknam Prasop, only to be ambushed and overwhelmed from the flanks. The Siamese again suffered heavy losses and defeat for the second time at Paknam Prasop, with dead bodies of Siamese soldiers scattering on the battlefield. Curious Ayutthayan battle spectators were also killed. The Burmese captured 1,000 Siamese personnel and 100 of Siamese elephants as war spoils.

=== Western Front: Battle of Wat Phukhaothong ===
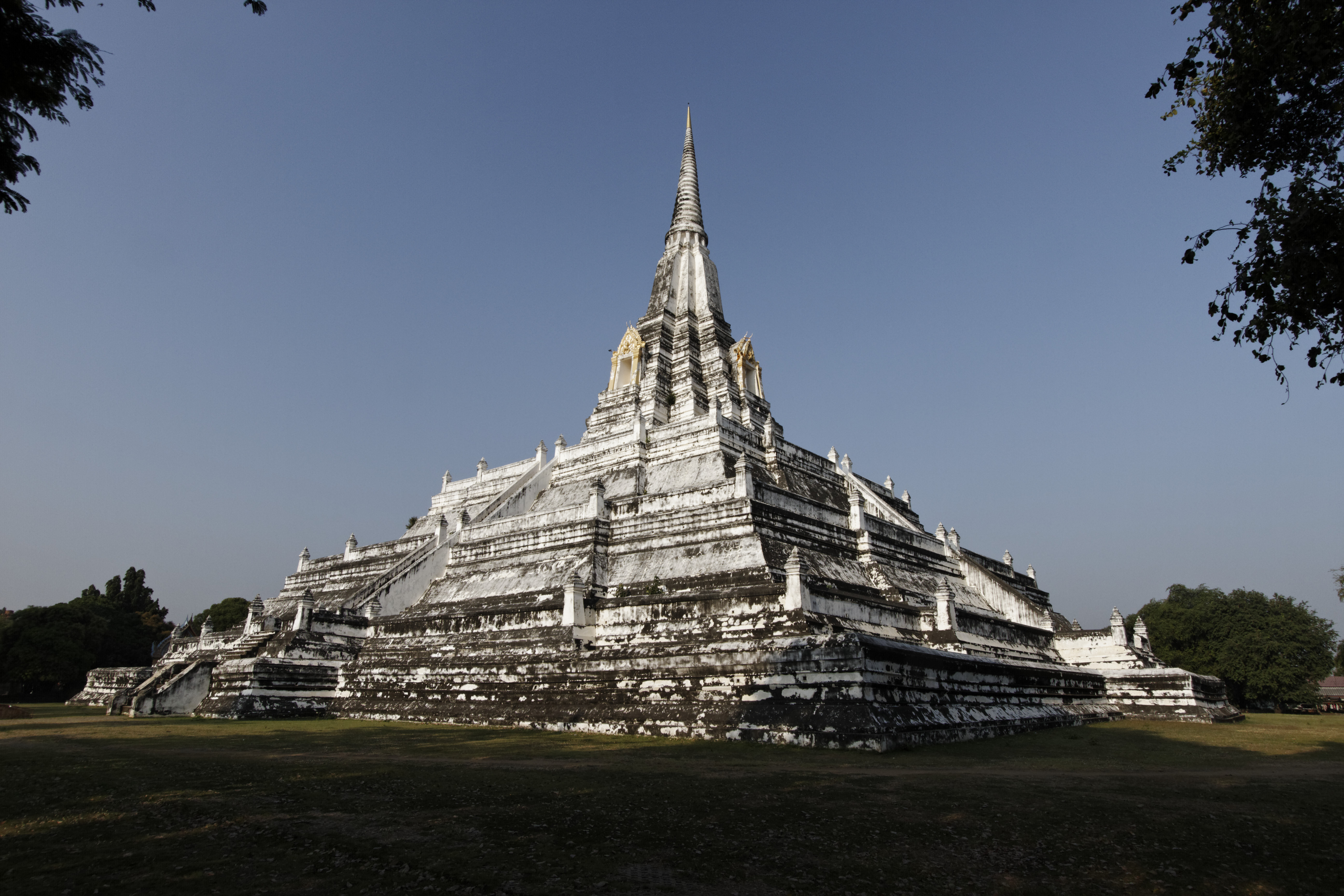
Burmese-Siamese fusion style Chedi of Wat Phukhaothong temple to the northwest of Ayutthaya was built by Burmese king Bayinnaung at the First Fall of Ayutthaya in 1569 and was the site of a Burmese-Siamese battle in January 1766.

Five days after Siamese defeat at Paknam Prasop, in late January 1766, the Siamese made another attempt to attack the Burmese at the outskirts. King Ekkathat made a last-ditch effort to prevent a siege of the city by sending two armies of 50,000 men, 400 elephants and 1,000 guns under Phraya Phetchaburi Rueang (called Bra Than in Burmese chronicles) the governor of Phetchaburi and Phraya Tak (future King Taksin) to attack Maha Nawrahta at Siguk to the west of Ayutthaya. Swelled by the Siamese levies, Maha Nawrahta responded by sending two armies, with 20,000 men, 100 elephants and 500 horses each (total of 40,000 men, surpassing their pre-invasion strength of 20,000–30,000 men), under Nemyo Gonnarat and Mingyi Zeyathu. The Burmese took position at the Chedi pagoda of Wat Phukhaothong temple, which was built by the Burmese king Bayinnaung after the First Fall of Ayutthaya in 1569 some two hundred years earlier, to the northwest of Ayutthaya, leading to the Battle of Wat Phukhaothong in January 1766. Siamese forces came out and attacked Burmese positions centered around the Chedi Phukhao Thong Pagoda. Phraya Phetchaburi and Phraya Tak implemented a new strategy. Instead of directly charging onto all Burmese contingents at once, Siamese commanders chose to single out the Burmese west wing regiment of Mingyi Zeyathu at the west side of the pagoda to attack. The Siamese governor of Suphanburi, who had joined the Burmese ranks, volunteered to fight his own former Siamese comrades. Phraya Phetchaburi challenged the former governor of Suphanburi for a personal battle. The governor of Phetchaburi (fought for Siam) and the governor of Suphanburi (fought for Burma) engaged in an elephant duel. However, the defected governor of Suphanburi was eventually shot dead by a Siamese fire.

Mingyi Zeyathu at the west wing faced intense Siamese attacks and was on the verge of being routed. Mingyi Zeyathu decided to fall back in order to feign retreat and maneuvered to the eastern side of the pagoda, successfully outflanking the Siamese in the rear. Nemyo Gonnarat, upon seeing Mingyi Zeyathu's movements, drove his army to join the commotion. The Siamese were attacked in both front and rear, split into two, encircled, routed and defeated. Phraya Phetchaburi and Phraya Tak retreated into the Ayutthaya citadel. The Burmese captured 2,000 Siamese men, 200 Siamese elephants and 200 Siamese guns. The ensuing battle wiped out much of the several-thousand-strong Siamese army and the rest were taken prisoner. The remaining Siamese troops retreated into the city and shut the gates.

After the battle, Maha Nawrahta at Siguk praised the Siamese governor of Suphanburi who, despite being a Siamese, died in the war for Burma. Maha Nawrahta pointed out that Mingyi Zeyathu had violated the martial law by cowering and retreating in the face of the enemies, making rash movements causing losses on Burmese side and, therefore, deserved death penalty. Nemyo Gonnarat and other Burmese commanders, however, defended Mingyi Zeyathu by saying that decisions of Mingyi Zeyathu was made out of desperate attempts to save the situation as his contingent was heavily attacked by the Siamese. Maha Nawrahta then said that Mingyi Zeyathu was still guilty by the law but he would pardon and spare Mingyi Zeyathu only by the pleas of his comrade commanders.

== Bang Rachan encampment ==
By February 1766, the Chiang Mai Burmese column under Nemyo Thihapate had swept all the way from the north to Ang Thong, taking position and battling in the northern outskirts of Ayutthaya. While Nemyo Thihapate was besieging Ayutthaya, a local resistance of Siamese villagers of Bang Rachan emerged in his rear. The Bang Rachan or Bang Rajan encampment village was the first and only successful movement against the Burmese invaders since the beginning of the war. Bang Rachan was led by non-elite commoners. It was one of very few commoner deeds that was recorded in Siamese royal chronicles. The story of Bang Rachan villagers was totally absent in Burmese chronicles, maybe due to the fact that Bang Rachan resistance, if ever existed, was a minor threat to the main Burmese army. Bang Rachan narrative was recounted many times in versions of Thai chronicles, earliest extant in 1795, written in patriotic tone. The story of Bang Rachan was expanded by nationalist historiography of early twentieth century and continued to inspire Thai nationalism into modern times.

Inhabitants of fallen Siamese towns either fled into the forests or entered into service of Burmese military. Bang Rachan villagers fought with a local Burmese garrison in Wiset Chaichan rather than the main Burmese forces. A venerable monk Phra Acharn Thammachot from Suphanburi moved to reside in Wat Phokaoton temple in Bang Rachan, attracting many followers. By February 1766, refugee Siamese people from many towns in the area including Wiset Chaichan, Singburi and Sankhaburi gathered in Bang Rachan around the monk Thammachot. A group of Siamese men led by Nai Thaen were dissatisfied with Burmese treatment as they were extorted of money and family members, according to Thai chronicles. Nai Thaen then led his group to kill a number of Burmese officials and fled to join the monk Thammachot at Bang Rachan, leading to the inception of Bang Rachan encampment in February/March 1766. By the time of Bang Rachan uprising, the Burmese main armies had already established themselves on the outskirts of Ayutthaya.

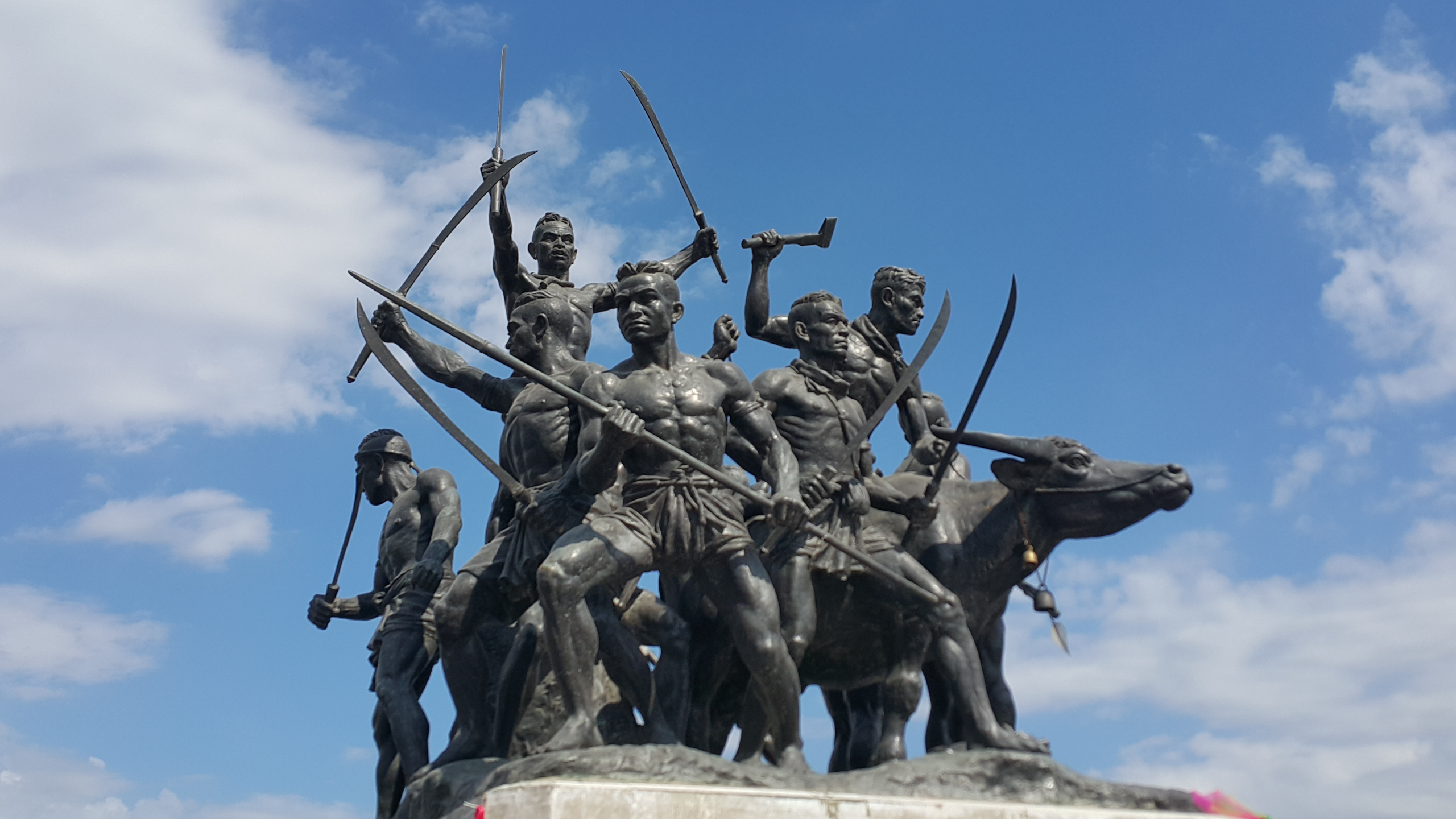
Statues of Bang Rachan fighters, by Italian sculptor Corrado Feroci, in modern Tambon Bang Rachan, Khai Bang Rachan district, Sing Buri Province.

Nai Thaen was the leader of the Bang Rachan defenders, while the monk Thammachot served as the spiritual leader, enchanting magical amulets for Bang Rachan fighters. Nai Thaen fortified his position in Bang Rachan and gathered 400 men for battle. Bang Rachan endured eight Burmese attacks in five months, according to Thai tradition, from February to June 1766. The minor Burmese garrison at Wiset Chaichan sent first attack with 500 men, second attack with 700 men and third attack with 900 men, all of which were repelled by Bang Rachan. The fourth attack in March 1766 was remembered as a victorious battle for the Siamese. The Burmese forces of 1,000 men approached Bang Rachan. Nai Thaen, now had 600 men, led his compatriots to fight the Burmese at a canal in modern Sawaeng Ha, Ang Thong. The Burmese were again repelled and the Burmese commander was killed. However, Nai Thaen the Bang Rachan leader was incapacitated by a gunshot on his knee. The leadership was then taken over by another Siamese commoner man Nai Chan Nuad Kheo ('Chan the Moustached').

After initial success of Bang Rachan encampment, the Burmese were opted to send larger troops. The sixth wave of more than 1,000 Burmese men was led by a Sitke from Tavoy. Bang Rachan requested two cannons from Ayutthaya to step up the defense. However, King Ekkathat decided not to grant the cannons to Bang Rachan for fear that if Bang Rachan was to fall to the Burmese, the precious Ayutthayan cannons would fall into Burmese hands. Phraya Rattanathibet the Minister of Palace Affairs went to Bang Rachan to help the defenders to cast their own cannons from bronze. The seventh attack from 1,000-men Burmese force was again repelled by Bang Rachan, under leadership of Nai Chan

The war between Bang Rachan and the Burmese took a turn in April/May 1766 when Thugyi, a Mon refugee in Siam, collaborated with Burma and volunteered to take down Bang Rachan. (When the Burmese forces left Siam after the fall of Ayutthaya, this Thugyi was left to be in charge of small Burmese garrison in Ayutthaya.) Thugyi improvised a new strategy by not facing the Siamese in open field but rather fortified himself in a stockade. Nai Chan led Bang Rachan fighters to attack Thugyi but failed to dislodge the Mon commander. Thugyi retaliated by attacking (the eighth and last time) and firing cannons into Bang Rachan, killing many Bang Rachan villagers, leading to the Battle of Bang Rachan in May. Phraya Rattanathibet managed to cast two cannons but they were broken and not functional. Nai Chan the leader of Bang Rachan was shot dead in battle. Rattanathibet then gave up and returned to Ayutthaya. Bang Rachan persisted until 20 June (2nd waning of eighth lunar month), 1766 when Bang Rachan encampment finally fell to the Burmese after enduring eight Burmese attacks in five months. Bang Rachan villagers eventually dispersed and the resistance was put to end.

== First Chinese invasion of Burma (December 1765 – April 1766) ==
Burmese and Chinese sphere of power had been overlapping in the Shan and Tai Nuea states at the Burmese–Chinese frontiers, where the trans-border trade between Yunnan and Burma had been flourishing. With the declining powers of the Burmese Toungoo dynasty in early half of eighteenth century, Qing China exerted influence over those border Tai states including Mogaung and Bhamo in Irrawaddy valley, Hsenwi and Tai Lue Sipsongpanna. These Shan states served as the buffer between Burma and China and also paid tributes to one or both powers. With the resurgence of Burma under Alaungpaya of the newly-founded Konbaung dynasty, however, Burma regained its control over the Shan states, leading to Sino–Burmese conflicts on the borders. In 1758, King Alaungpaya sent Burmese forces to attack and conquer Hsenwi because the saopha of Hsenwi, Sao Mengti, had supported the Burmese Prince Shwedaung, son of Maha Damayaza the last king of Toungoo dynasty, in his contest to Alaungpaya's rule in Burma. Sao Mengti fled Hsenwi and soon died in Yunnan. The Burmese appointed Sao Hkam Pat, half-brother of Sao Mengti, as the new pro-Burmese saopha of Hsenwi. In 1762, Burmese forces, from Hsenwi, attacked the Tai Nuea states of Gengma and Mengding, which China considered under its influence. However, Sao Hkam Pat was overthrown and killed, replaced by the anti-Burmese Sao Kham Leng as the saopha. In 1765, Burma sent forces to reconquer Hsenwi and expelled Sao Kham Leng, who also took refuge in Yunnan.

In the same time, there was a civil war in Kengtung between two contenders for the throne – Sao Mong Hsam and his nephew Sao Pin. Sao Pin had taken refuge in Yunnan against his uncle. In 1765, King Hsinbyushin sent Nemyo Thihapate to subjugate and pacify Lanna as a part of his plan to conquer Ayutthaya. Also in 1765, the combined Burmese–Kengtung forces attacked Sipsongpanna, which had been under Chinese suzerainty. Previously, the Qing had pursued a non-interventionist policy by letting the allied native Tai chiefs to ward off Burmese invasions by themselves. However, in 1765, Liu Zhao (劉藻) the Viceroy of Yungui tried an alternative policy by deploying the main Qing Green Banner Army to fend off Burmese attacks, considering the native Tai forces ineffective against the Burmese. As Sino–Burmese tension escalated, the Burmese court shut down the Shan borders, hampering the Yunnanese traders from conducting their usual businesses. The Yunnanese–Chinese merchants forced their way through the Burmese border barricade, resulting in two incidents, in which a Chinese merchant was imprisoned in Bhamo (Wanmaw) and another killed in Kengtung. Provoked, Chinese authorities in Yunnan then used these minor incidents as the pretext for military punishment. The Chinese merchants complained to the Chinese authorities in Yunnan about the incidents. Sao Pin, the Kengtung prince who had taken refuge there, instigated Liu Zhao to attack Kengtung. Burmese incursions into Gengma, Mengding and Sipsongpanna, combined with mistreatments of Chinese merchants, provided context for China to invade Burma.

After Nemyo Thihapate had left Lanna to invade Ayutthaya in mid-1765, Liu Zhao sent 3,500 men from the Green Standard Army to attack Kengtung in December 1765, leading to the first Chinese invasion of Burma. However, the Chinese invaders were readily repelled by the Burmese commander Nemyo Sithu in Kengtung. The Qianlong Emperor, upon hearing about the Chinese defeat in Kengtung, sacked Liu Zhao from his position and appointed Yang Yingju (楊應琚) as the new viceroy of Yungui instead. Liu Zhao then committed suicide out of guilt and shame. Though battle-hardened Burmese forces eventually drove back the besiegers, Burma was now fighting on two fronts, one of which had the largest army in the world. Nonetheless, Hsinbyushin apparently (as it turned out, mistakenly) believed that the border conflict could be contained as a low-grade war. He refused to recall his armies in Siam though he did reinforce Burmese garrisons along the Chinese border—in Kengtung, Kenghung and Kaungton.

== Siamese Preparations ==
=== Siamese defensive strategy ===
Ayutthaya had repaired and revitalized its unused defense system since Alaungpaya's invasion in 1760. However, the manpower control inefficiency continued to haunt Siamese defense capabilities. Effective manpower mobilization and strong military leadership was not present as they were in the sixteenth century. Peripheral governors had been deprived of their military prowess for they were prone to rebellions. King Ekkathat had sent Siamese forces to halt the Burmese advances at the frontiers but they were all defeated and failed. Siamese commanders were inexperienced and lacked strategies against the tactics of the Burmese. Ayutthaya exerted futile and minimal attempts to hold peripheral cities as the Burmese invaded. Ayutthayan court recruited forces from the peripheral cities, including their governors, to defend Ayutthaya city. This left the periphery even less defended as outlying Siamese towns quickly fell to Burmese conquests. With the Burmese victories at Paknam Prasop and Wat Phukhaothong in January 1766, they were able to set foot on Ayutthayan outskirts to lay siege on the Siamese royal city. Suffering from defeats, Ayutthaya had no choice but to resort to traditional defensive strategy. Siam evacuated all people from the suburbs into the city, shut the city gates tight and put up defenses.

Siamese defense strategy relied on supposed impregnability of Ayutthaya's city walls and the arrival of Siamese wet season. Traditional warfare between Burma and Siam were usually conducted in dry season between January and August. The rains arrived in May and the waters began to rise in September, reaching the peak in November. In the flooding season, outlying areas of Ayutthaya became inundated and turned into a vast sea of flood water. Any invaders were obliged to leave Ayutthaya at the advent of flooding season as high water level would cripple the warfare. Military personnel would find less comfort in floods and provisions would be damaged. King Ekkathat and his court contemplated that the Burmese would eventually retreat at the end of dry season. However, the Burmese had other plans and did not intend to leave. King Hsinbyushin planned his campaign to conquer Siam to possibly span many years, not to be deterred by the rainy season. Siam would simply wait for the Burmese to run out of their endurance and, with the coming of the treacherous rainy season, became exhausted, eventually abandoning their campaign. The Siamese command had made careful preparations to defend the capital. The fortifications consisted of a high brick wall with a broad wet ditch. The walls were mounted with numerous guns and cannon that they had stockpiled since the last Burmese war. Finally, they had banked on the advent of the rainy season, which had more than once saved the city in the past. They believed that if they could only hold out until the onset of the monsoon rains and the flooding of the great Central Plain, the Burmese would be forced to retreat.

When the Burmese approached Ayutthaya in January 1766, King Ekkathat moved all of Buddhist monks in temples of Ayutthayan outskirts, including his brother Uthumphon the temple king, to take refuge inside of Ayutthaya city walls. Uthumphon moved from Wat Pradu Songtham temple to reside at Wat Ratcha Praditsathan temple adjacent to the northern wall inside of Ayutthaya citadel. Uthumphon had previously left monkhood to command the war during Alaungpaya's invasion of 1760 but he faced political repercussion from Ekkathat. This time, Uthumphon was again asked to do the same thing by some Siamese nobles but the temple king sternly refused. Whenever he went out from his temple to ask for alms, Uthumphon received many letters pleading him to save the kingdom but Uthumphon was persistent on his stay in monkhood.

=== Ayutthaya City Walls and Armory ===
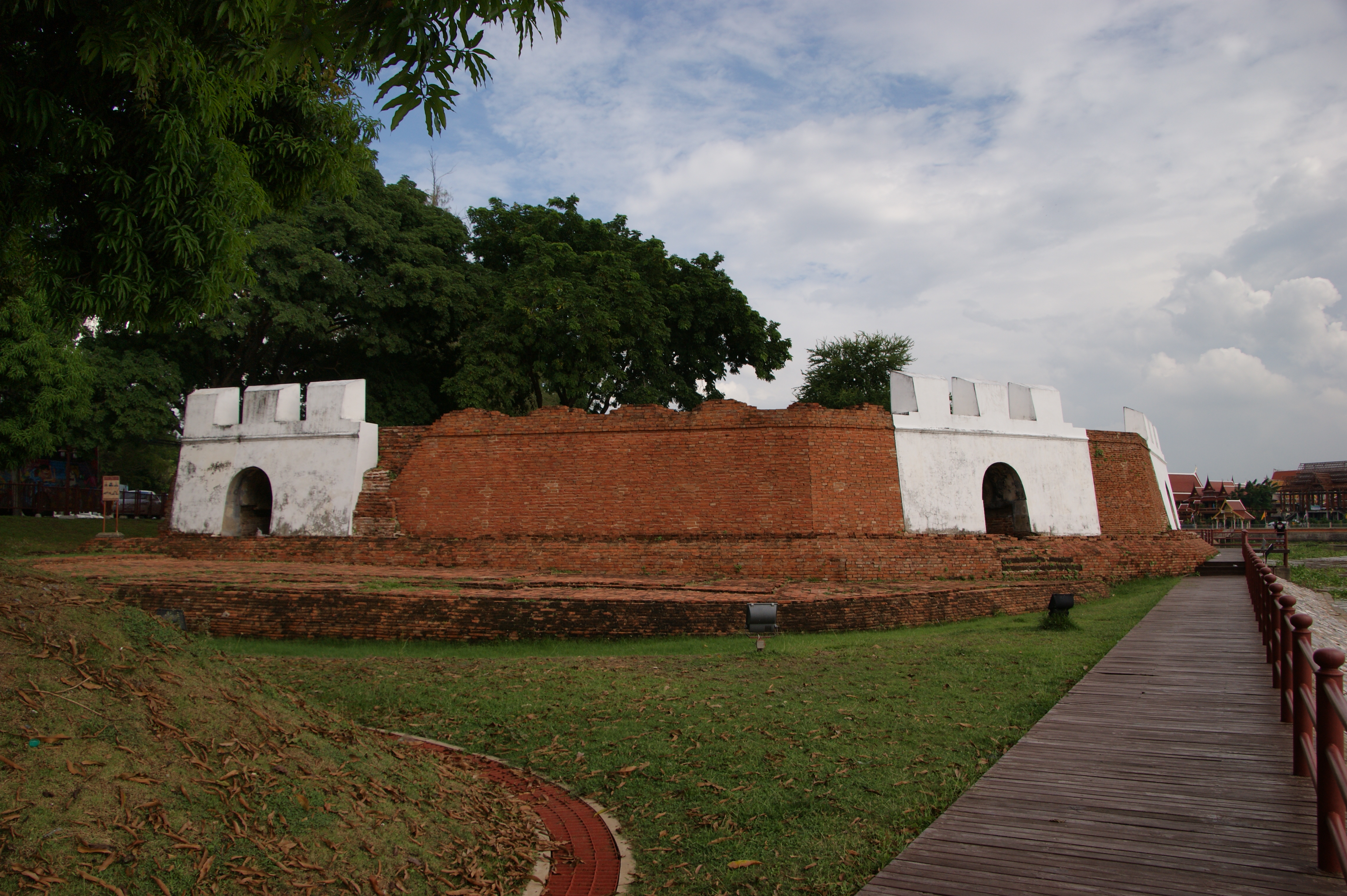
Pomphet Fort, built in 1550, had been the largest fortress on southern side of Ayutthaya. Current hexagonal design is attributed to French architect La Mare in 1685.

The Ayutthaya city situated on an island at the confluence of three rivers – namely Chao Phraya, Lopburi and Pasak, surrounded by the waters serving as natural city moat. During the period of Burmese–Siamese wars of the sixteenth century, Ayutthaya city walls were rebuilt from brick and stones and expanded to fully reach riverbanks of all sides. During the long period of external peace, the Ayutthayan walls stood for two centuries with limited usage. The walls were renovated several times. The most important occasion was during the reign of King Narai when Western engineers contributed to more sturdy, reinforced style of the wall. After 1586, no invaders had reached the Ayutthaya city for nearly two hundred years until 1760. The Ayutthaya city walls stood three wa and two sok (seven meters) in height with two wa (about four meters) in thickness. It has up to sixty regular city gates with about twenty large tunnel gates that allowed large group of people or domesticated animals to pass. It also has water gates that facilitate riparian transports.

Siam had learned production of matchlock firearms and bronze cannons from the Portuguese in the sixteenth century. Siam had domestic furnaces for cannon casting and became a renowned manufacturer of cannons. However, both Burma and Siam were unable to produce their own flintlock muskets, which were to be exclusively imported from the Europeans. Siamese government purchased a large number of Western-produced, cast-iron, larger-caliber cannons. Some of the cannon were thirty feet (9.1 m) long, and fired 100 lb (45 kg) balls. Individual cannons were religiously worshipped by the Siamese for they believed supernatural protector spirits resided in those cannons. Siam also utilized small-caliber breechloader cannons that were employed in hundreds into battlefields and could also be mounted onto elephants or ships.

Even though Ayutthaya possessed a large number of firearms, during the Burmese invasion of 1765–1767, they were not utilized to full potential. Long hiatus from warfare meant few Siamese were skilled to effectively operate those firearms. It is shown in Thai chronicles narrative that Siamese cannoneers mishandled their own cannons and missed their targets. When the Burmese finally captured Ayutthaya in 1767, they found over 10,000 new muskets and ammunition in the royal armory, still unused even after a 14-month siege. Meanwhile, the Burmese put emphasis on marksmanship training to inflict greatest damage on their enemies. In 1759, King Alaungpaya issued a royal decree instructing his musketeers on how to properly use the flintlock firearms. It is estimated that sixty percent of Burmese military personnel operated flintlock muskets.

== Siege of Ayutthaya (January 1766 – April 1767) ==
=== Early siege ===
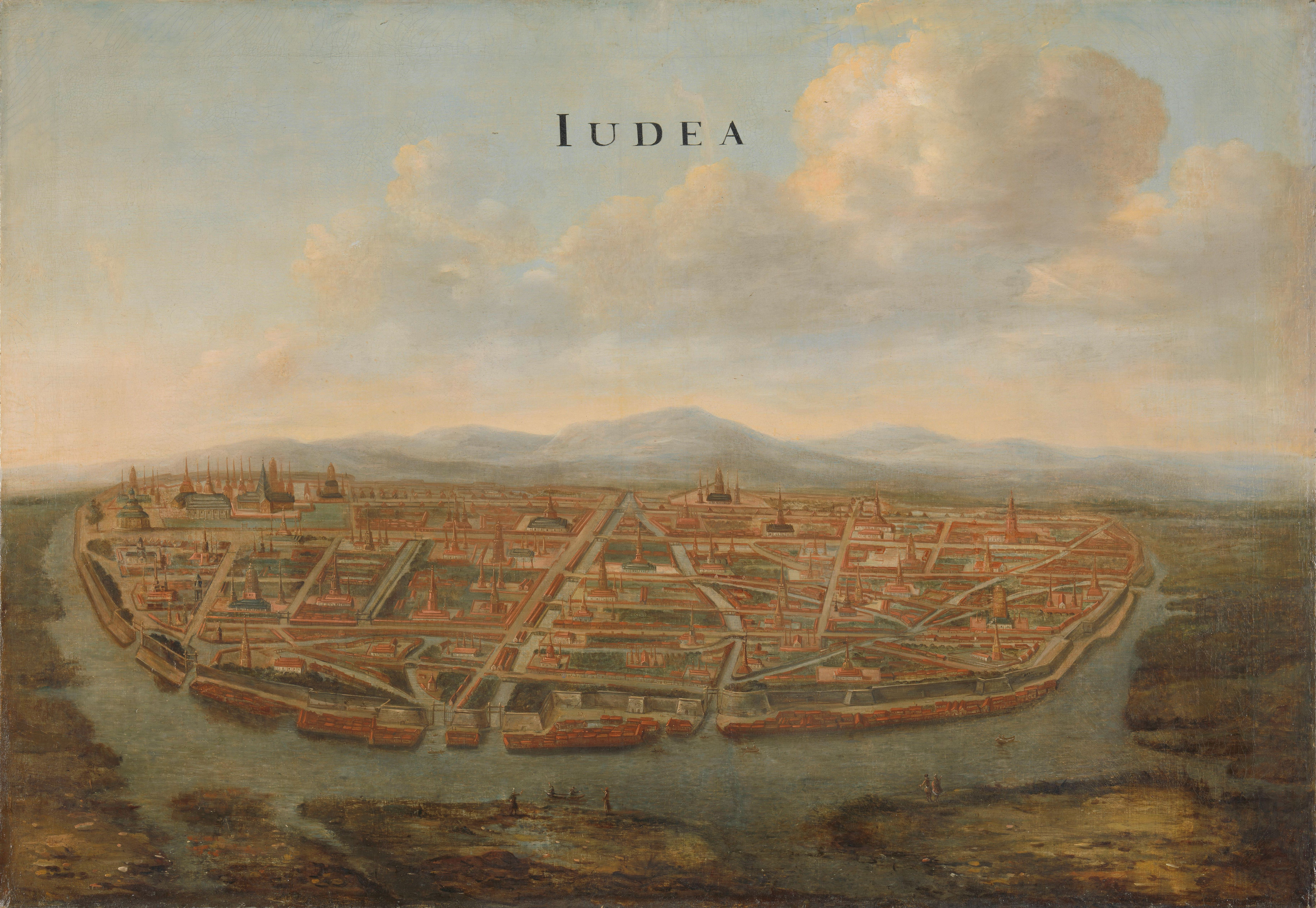
City of Ayutthaya, c. 1665, painted by Johannes Vingboons

In February 1766, the Burmese invading armies laid siege on Ayutthaya with two Bogyoke or grand commanders Maha Nawrahta and Nemyo Thihapate encamping in the west and the north of Ayutthaya, respectively;

- Maha Nawrahta, with his Burmese Tavoy column of more than 20,000 men and his subordinate commanders including Nemyo Gonnarat, Mingyi Zeyathu and Mingyi Kamani Sanda, stationed at Siguk about ten kilometers to the west of Ayutthaya.
- Nemyo Thihapate, with his Burmese Lanna column of more than 20,000 men, headquartered at Paknam Prasop about seven kilometers to the north of Ayutthaya.

Realizing that they had less than four months before the rainy season, the Burmese command initially launched a few assaults on the city walls. But the place proved too strong and too well-defended. Because of the numerous stockades outside the city, the Burmese could not even get near the wall, and those that got near were cut down by musket fire from atop. The Burmese now drew a line of entrenchments round the city, and prepared to reduce it by famine. The Siamese inside of Ayutthaya, however, flared quite well during the initial stage of the siege. Food supply was plentiful inside of the city as French missionary noted that "the beggars alone suffered from hunger and some died of it". Life went on as usual in the Ayutthaya citadel. Burmese blockade of Ayutthaya was relatively less-manned on the eastern side as it would later be shown that Ayutthaya was still able to communicate with outside through eastern perimeters. This Burmese–Siamese war then became a battle of endurance. No major battles occurred in Ayutthaya for seven months between February and September 1766.

=== Eastern Front: Battle of Paknam Yothaka ===
By 1766, Western and Northern Siam had fallen under Burmese occupation but Eastern Siam remained untouched. Since mid-1765, Prince Kromma Muen Thepphiphit, Ekkathat's rebellious half-brother, had been put under political confinement in Chanthaburi on Siamese eastern coast by orders of King Ekkathat. There, Prince Thepphiphit attracted a large number of Eastern Siamese followers. In mid-1766, upon learning about developments in Ayutthaya, Thepphiphit decided to gather his men from Chanthaburi and move to Prachinburi, establishing himself. Already a prominent political figure, Prince Thepphiphit became a new rallying point for anti-Burmese movement in Siam. Eastern Siamese men from Prachinburi, Nakhon Nayok, Chonburi, Bang Lamung and Chachoengsao rallied to Prince Thepphiphit at Prachinburi. Prince Thepphiphit built himself a stockade at Paknam Yothaka, about 30 kilometers to the southwest of Prachinburi at the confluence of Bangpakong and Nakhon Nayok rivers in modern Ban Sang, Prachinburi, to muster an army to attack the besieging Burmese at Ayutthaya. Thepphiphit's place at Prachinburi accommodated ten thousands of Siamese war refugees. The Siamese prince raised a vanguard army of 2,000 men, preparing to march to Ayutthaya and declaring to save the Siamese royal city.

When the news Prince Thepphiphit's uprising reached Ayutthaya, a large number of Siamese nobles and their subordinates left Ayutthaya to join with Thepphiphit at Prachinburi to the east, including Phraya Rattanathibet the Minister of Palace Affairs and many-time commander. Motivation of Prince Thepphiphit in his uprising probably stemmed from both patriotic and political intentions. King Ekkathat, who would never trust Thepphiphit, sent several forces to subjugate his restive half-brother. Maha Nawrahta and Nemyo Thihapate also sent Burmese forces to the east to put down Thepphiphit. The Burmese forces attacked Prince Thepphiphit at Paknam Yothaka, leading to the Battle of Paknam Yothaka in September 1766. Eastern Siamese regiment of Prince Thepphiphit was annihilated by the Burmese, with Thepphiphit fleeing to the northeast. Eastern Siamese resistance to Burmese invaders eventually dispersed. The Burmese then settled in Prachinburi and at Paknam Cholo in modern Bang Khla, Chachoengsao on Bangpakong River, leading to Burmese presence in Eastern Siam (these Burmese contingents would later engage in battle with Phraya Tak four months later in January 1767.).

Prince Thepphiphit and his followers including Phraya Rattanathibet fled to the northeast. However, Rattanathibet fell ill and died. Thepphiphit held a funeral for his minister and proceeded to Nakhon Ratchasima (Khorat). Phraya Nakhon Ratchasima the governor of Khorat considered Prince Thepphiphit to be a political threat and threatened to arrest the prince. Thepphiphit then sent his son Prince Prayong to lead a small force to assassinate the Khorat governor in September 1766. Prince Thepphiphit then took power in Nakhon Ratchasima. However, five days later, Luang Phaeng, brother of the murdered Khorat governor, sought assistance from Phra Phimai the governor of Phimai and brought forces to avenge for his dead brother. Khorat city fell to Luang Phaeng, who sought vengeance by killing Prince Prayong and other sons of Thepphiphit. Luang Phaeng also proposed to execute Prince Thepphiphit but Phra Phimai took Thepphiphit with him to Phimai town under his watch.

=== Burmese encirclement ===
In September 1766, the Burmese forces, along with grand commanders Maha Nawrahta and Nemyo Thihapate, approached Ayutthaya city walls to encircle the city;

- Western Front: Maha Nawrahta moved from Siguk to Wat Phukhaothong temple, whose pagoda was built by Burmese king Bayinnaung two centuries earlier, with his vanguard at Wat Thakarong temple just 500 meters from Ayutthayan wall.
- Northern Front: Nemyo Thihapate moved from Paknam Prasop down to Phosamton, about five kilometers north of Ayutthaya. Phosamton was a site of Mon refugee community. The Burmese enslaved the local Mon population in Phosamton, took their food supply and marshaled them into Burmese armies.

Burmese armies reached Ayutthayan city walls on 14 September 1766. Ayutthaya sent forces to attack the Burmese at Wat Thakarong to prevent them from encamping but was again defeated. As the Burmese had come within the range of Siamese cannon, the Siamese made an attempt to fire a cannon from the Siamese Satkop fort in the northwestern corner of the city to Burmese riverine fleet at Wat Thakarong to the west. Siamese cannon shot scored a direct hit, killing several men on two Burmese boats but the cannon itself broke and became unusable.

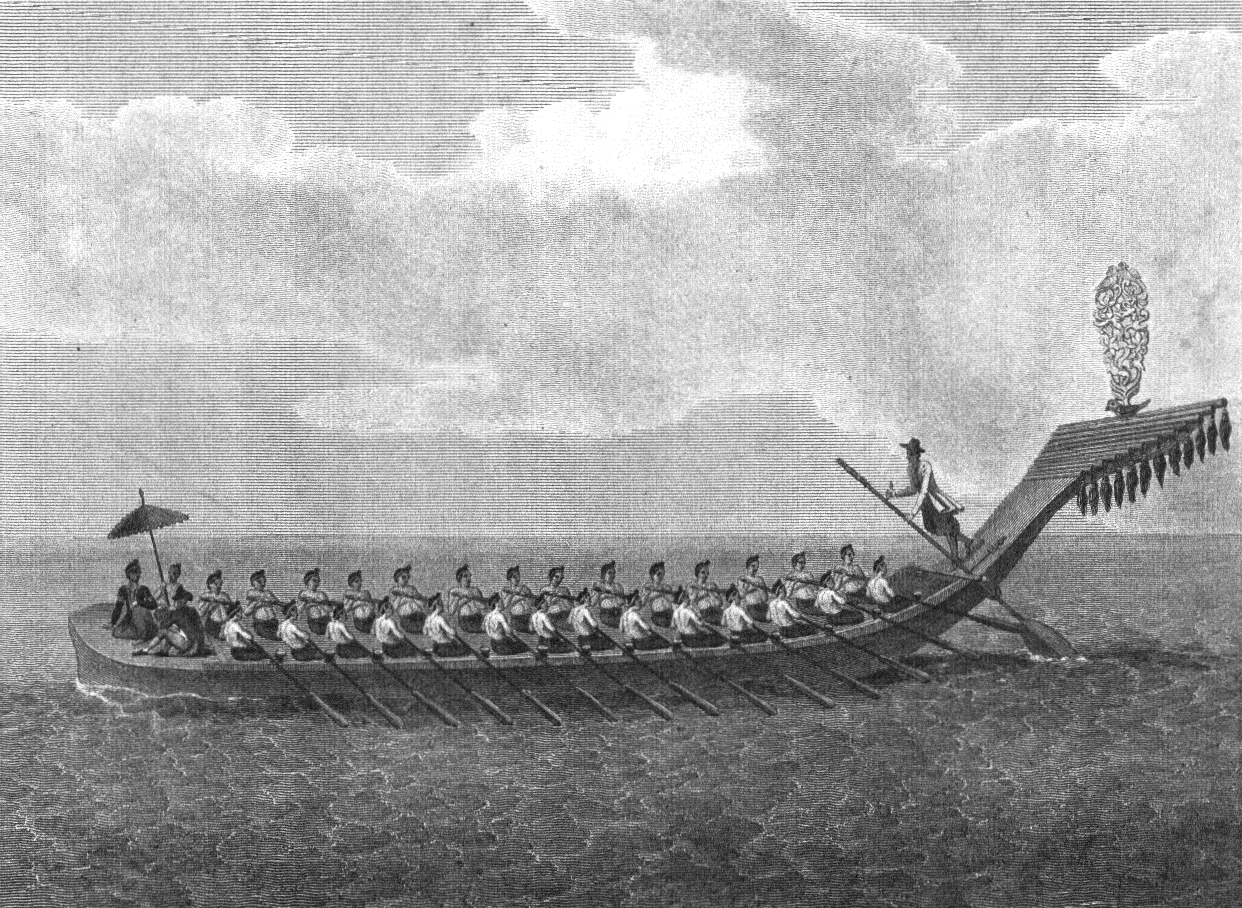
A Konbaung-era Burmese war boat, c.1795

By September 1766, Siamese defenders realized that the Burmese would not leave. As time passed and no signs of Siamese surrender appeared, the approach of the dreaded rainy season caused alarm among the Burmese command. Several senior commanders advised calling off the invasion. However, Maha Nawrahta decided to continue the invasion, and his colleague Thihapate supported him. The Burmese command now made preparations to meet the rise of the river by collecting boats and building embankments on the bits of high ground. Maha Nawrahta ordered the rice to be cultivated in paddy fields in Ayutthaya suburbs to produce food. When the rains came, the Burmese line of entrenchment round the city was swallowed up by the rising river. The Burmese were now broken up into several corps clinging on to artificial islands around the city. Seeing that the enemy was scattered into isolated camps, the Siamese attacked them in boats. The Burmese also had plenty of boats and met the Siamese boats in kind.

=== Southern Front: Battle of Wat Sangkhawat ===
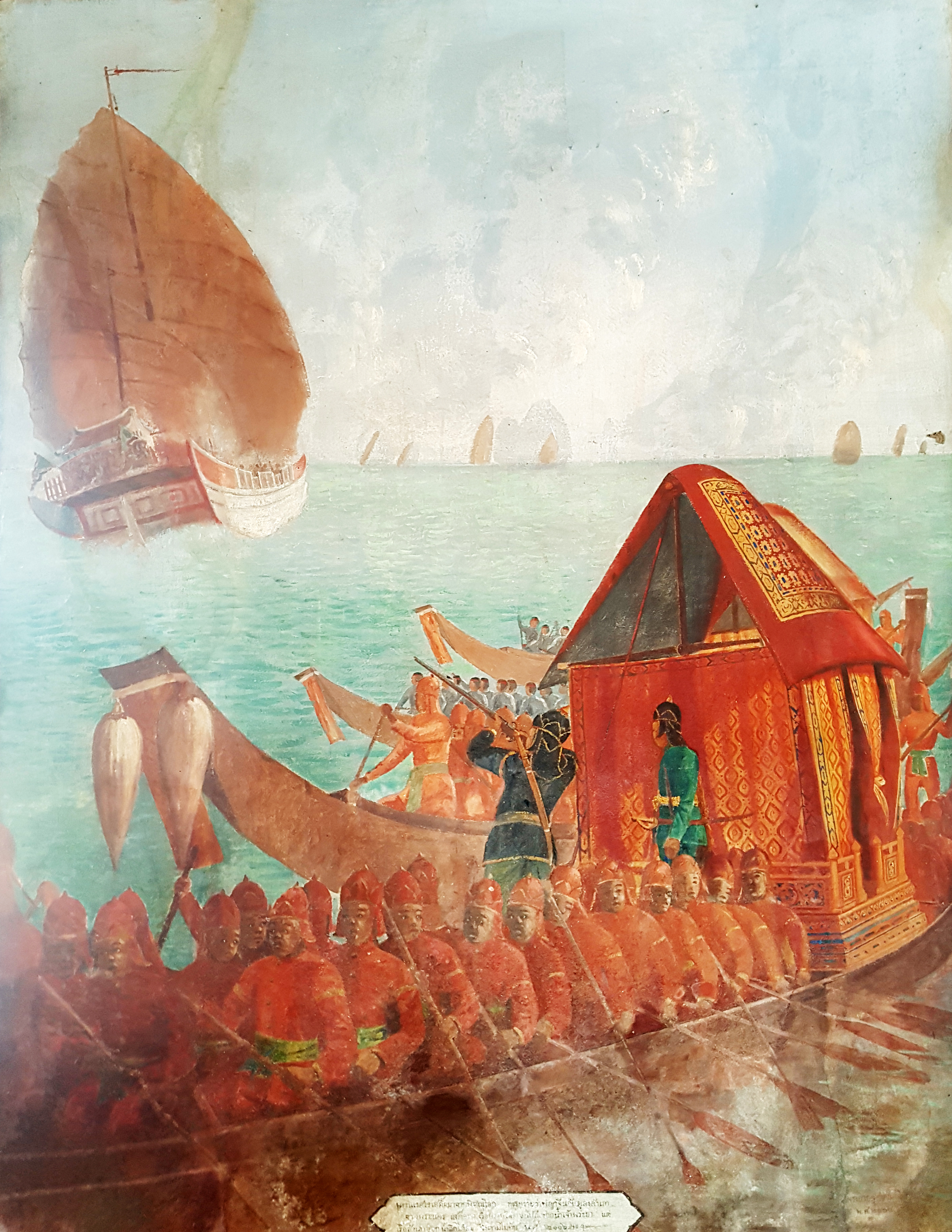
An Ayutthaya-era Siamese war boat

As of November 1766, the flooding water surrounding Ayutthaya was at its peak as both the Burmese and the Siamese could only navigate by boats. Ekkathat assigned his to commanders Phraya Phetchaburi Rueang and Phraya Tak to Wat Yai Chaimongkhon temple to the southeast off the city walls with ten thousands of men. When the Burmese fleet from Bangsai approached Ayutthaya from the south, Phetchaburi Rueang and Phraya Tak sailed their Siamese fleet to meet the Burmese fleet near Wat Sangkhawat temple about two kilometers to the southeast of Ayutthaya, leading to the Battle of Wat Sangkhawat in November 1766. A fierce battle ensued as both the Burmese and the Siamese jumped onto each other's boat to engage in hand-to-hand combats. Phraya Phetchaburi the Siamese commander was surrounded by twenty Burmese boats. A Burmese gunman named Nga San Tun rowed his boat to capture Phraya Phetchaburi. Phraya Phetchaburi jumped onto Nga San Tun's boat, preparing to slash the Burmese gunmen with his sword. Nga San Tun took quick action by hitting Phraya Phetchaburi with a ramrod. Thai chronicles stated that Phraya Phetchaburi was brought down dead by a musket shot but Burmese chronicles said otherwise that Phraya Phetchaburi, known as Bra Than, was captured alive. With their leader supposedly dead, the Siamese panicked and retreated. Phraya Tak, however, was idle for most of the battle and did not engage to rescue his comrade Phraya Phetchaburi. The Burmese capture ten thousands of Siamese captives. Maha Nawrahta provided the Siamese captives with food and shelter. After his defeat, Phraya Tak chose not to return to Ayutthaya citadel and instead stationed his troops at Wat Phichaisongkhram temple off the eastern wall across the city moat.

=== Northern Front: Battle of Phosamton ===
In November 1766, ten days after Siamese defeat at Wat Sangkhawat, King Ekkathat sent another force to attack Nemyo Thihapate to the north. Nemyo Thihapate arranged his defensive positions. Two regiments with 5,000 men each were placed on both banks of Lopburi river at Uyin village (believed to be Phosamton), waiting to ambush. Nemyo Thihapate sent another 10,000 men to lure the Siamese fleet into his trap. Siamese fleet, with ten thousands of men, proceeded to the north, lured by the Burmese decoy fleet at Phaniat only a kilometer to the north of Ayutthaya where the elephant khedda stood. Unaware of the ambush, Siamese fleet sailed directly into Thihapate's trap. The Siamese fleet was annihilated by the ambush of Burmese forces from both river banks at the set up point with the Burmese capturing a large number of Siamese men.

By November 1766, after two devastating defeats at Wat Sangkhawat and Phosamton, according to Burmese chronicles, both Siamese court and populace trembled in fear and anxiety as they realized their situation had become dire. The Siamese decided to permanently shut the Ayutthaya city gates by completely sealing the gates with bricks, with only way to pass through was to climb across the wall using ropes. At any rate, the Siamese attempts to break the siege were unsuccessful. During this time, the Burmese troops farther back grew their own rice while their boats prevented supplies from entering the city. By the end of the monsoon season, the city was beginning to run low on provisions.

By December 1766, Siamese manpower had depleted and Ayutthaya could only send some thousands of men into battlefields. Ayutthaya also began to enlist foreigners to fight the Burmese. King Ekkathat put out another Siamese attempt to repel the Burmese by placing a regiment of 2,000 men at Wat Chaiwatthanaram temple to the southwest of Ayutthaya and other 2,000 Chinese men under leadership of Luang Aphaiphiphat the Chinese headman at Khlong Suan Phlu to the southeast of Ayutthaya. Luang Aphaiphiphat had previously led his Chinese mercenaries to engage in battle against the Burmese in 1760. Aphaiphiphat barricaded his Chinese contingent at the abandoned Dutch trade factory, as the Dutch had earlier abandoned their factory in the face of Burmese invasion in October 1765, leaving a large number of trade cargo.

=== Departure of Phraya Tak ===
Phraya Tak was a Siamese nobleman of Teochew Chinese immigrant background with personal name Zheng Xin (鄭新). His father Zheng Yong (鄭鏞) was a Chinese immigrant who married his Siamese wife. Formerly a merchant, Zheng Xin entered Siamese bureaucracy and was made Phraya Tak the governor of Tak in 1764 but, one year later, was called to join the defense of Ayutthaya against Burmese invaders. Phraya Tak actively engaged in battles and, by 1766, became one of the most prominent commanders in Siamese ranks.

By the end of 1766, situation had become desperate for the Siamese. The Burmese did not abandon the campaign in wet season and persisted into dry season when the water receded in January. Ayutthaya had depleted its food and manpower resources in its standing against Burmese besiegers as resistances against the invaders became increasingly futile. Great number of desperate Ayutthayan citizens simply surrendered to the besieging Burmese, who promised them fair treatment. Siamese leadership did not effectively deal with the situation. According to popular belief, Phraya Tak was put in a judicial trial for his unauthorized cannon shot as King Ekkathat had previously commanded that all cannon shots should be approved by the king himself. Phraya Tak was also blamed for the fall of his comrade Phraya Phetchaburi in the battle of Wat Sangkhawat in November 1766. These events disheartened Phraya Tak, who became convinced that the fall of Ayutthaya was inevitable and there was no use resisting the Burmese inside of the city. After his defeat at Wat Sangkhawat, Phraya Tak did not return to Ayutthaya citadel but rather stationed his troops at Wat Phichaisongkhram temple to the east of Ayutthaya.

Burmese actions on eastern facet of Ayutthaya was less intensive than other sides. At the end of 1766, Phraya Tak gathered his Chinese-Siamese followers of 500 men at Wat Phichaisongkhram temple. On 4 January 1767, Phraya Tak and his followers broke through relatively less-manned Burmese encirclement to the east to seek for new position in Eastern Siam. On that same night, a great fire broke out inside of Ayutthaya citadel, consuming about 10,000 houses.

The Burmese had occupied Prachinburi and Chachoengsao in Eastern Siam in aftermath of the subjugation of Prince Thepphiphit previously in September 1766. The Burmese garrison at Prachinburi moved against Phraya Tak, meeting the Chinese-Siamese forces at Phosaohan, about twenty kilometers to the east of Ayutthaya in modern Uthai district. Phraya Tak prevailed over the Burmese and proceeded to Prachinburi. Burmese fleet from Chachoengsao sailed upstream the Bangpakong river to attack Phraya Tak at Prachinburi. Phraya Tak shot his takeaway cannons from Ayutthaya to eliminate the Burmese in the battle of Prachinburi on 10 January. After defeating Burmese contingents in Eastern Siam, Phraya Tak went downstream the Bangpakong river to Chonburi, Pattaya and eventually settling in Rayong on eastern Siamese coast, which had been spared from Burmese invasion, in late January 1767.

=== Escalation ===
King Hsinbyushin did not set foot into Siam during the invasion of 1765–1767, letting his generals to do the conquest. While the Burmese armies had been besieging Ayutthaya, Yang Yingju successfully took Kengtung in May 1766, installing the rival contender Sao Pin as the ruler of Kengtung. Yang Yingju then planned the invasion into Burmese heartlands through Bhamo (Wanmaw), directly aiming at Ava the Burmese royal capital. The Shan saopha of Bhamo had already defected to Chinese side. Hsinbyushin, who had expected another Chinese invasion like the first one and had made preparations accordingly, was surprised by the sudden increase in the Chinese invasion force (25,000 versus 6,000 in the first invasion). He commanded Balamindin to fortify himself in a stockade at Kaungton near Bhamo and sent Maha Thiha Thura to attack the Chinese invading forces in the rear through Sipsongpanna. Yang Yingju, himself taking command position in Yongchang, sent Zhao Hongbang (趙宏榜) the governor of Tengyue (Momein) to lead the invasion to attack Bhamo through the Tiebi (鐵壁) Pass. Zhao Hongbang, from Tengyue, easily took Bhamo in October 1766 and attacked Balamindin's stockade at Kaungton. However, Balamindin held out against Chinese attacks, buying time until the Chinese became weakened by the diseases. The Chinese died more from malaria than military actions as the Kaungton stockade of Balamindin prevented further Chinese advances. Burmese commander Nemyo Sithu, with 15,000 men, retook Bhamo from Zhao Hongbang in January 1767. The Burmese then retook Kengtung and occupied Sipsongpanna. Burmese musketeers inflicted great losses on Chinese cavalry. Another Chinese contingent led by Li Shisheng (李時升) the commissioner of Yunnan invaded through Hsenwi but was attacked from both flanks by Nemyo Sithu from the west and Maha Thiha Thura from the east. Li Shisheng retreated to Longchuan (Mowun). The Burmese then followed the retreating Chinese to lay siege on Longchuan, which was in Chinese territories.

Burma then waged war on two fronts – China and Siam. Still, the fiery king Hsinbyushin was unwilling to recall the armies from Siam; instead he directed his remaining troops in northern Shan states to the Chinese front. He did however send a directive (dated 9 January 1767) to his commanders in Siam to take the city quickly, and return as they were needed to defend the homeland. Indeed, when it appeared that the Chinese situation was contained, he later sent another directive to the Siamese front to "persevere" in the siege. Maha Nawrahta then stated that Ayutthaya, in spite of many defeats, still persisted so efforts should be escalated in order to finish the conquest of Ayutthaya, Maha Nawrahta also proposed the tactics of digging an underground tunnel into Ayutthaya, taking the model from Theravadin Mahosadha Jataka, in which Mahosadha dug a tunnel into the city of Pancala to take the family members of Culani the king of Pancala, including his beautiful daughter Pancala Candi, into hostages. Nemyo Thihapate moved from Phosamton to Phaniat, where the elephant khedda stood, just at the northern wall of Ayutthaya. Nemyo Thihapate burnt down the Siamese Kotcha Pravet royal palace at Phaniat and constructed a tower there. The Burmese dismantled bricks from many Siamese temples in Ayutthaya suburbs to construct twenty-seven battle towers surrounding Ayutthaya with the height of seven taung (approximately three meters, see Myanmar units of measurement) and the circumferences ranging from 150 tas to 300 tas. Burmese towers allowed them to lift cannons to fire onto Ayutthaya, inflicting damages to the city. Some of the earthworks were higher than the walls, with cannon firing down on the city and the palace itself.

=== Southern Front: Chinese and Portuguese resistances ===
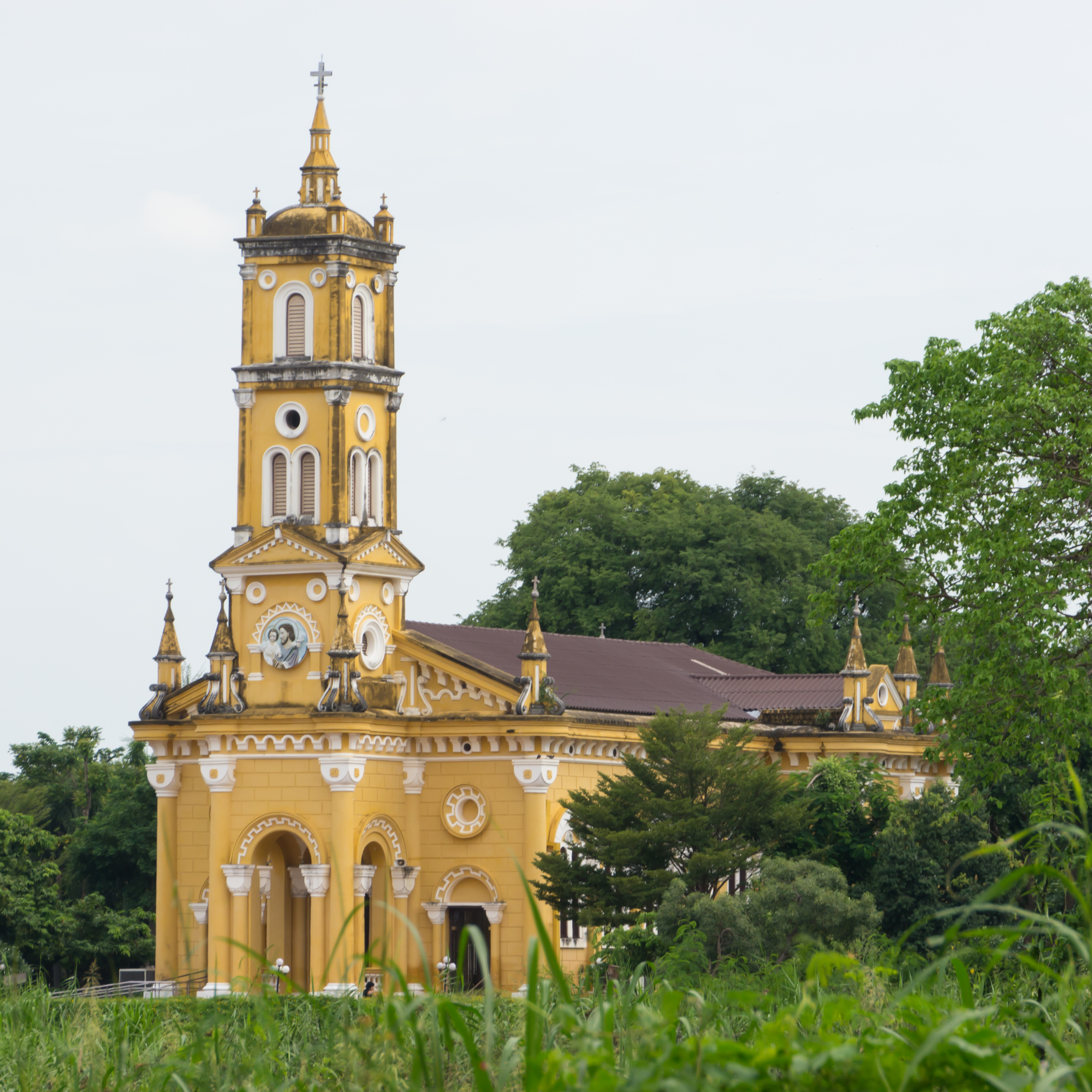
Saint Joseph Church on southern facet of Ayutthaya was founded in 1662 by French missionaries. The church had been the residence of Apostolic vicars of Siam until its destruction at the Burmese hands in March 1767. It was rebuilt in 1831 and its modern Neo-Romanesque architecture was conceived in 1883.

The Portuguese arrived in Ayutthaya in the sixteenth century and made their settlement at Ban Portuket about 1.5 kilometer downstream from the city wall to the south of Ayutthaya. Portuguese Dominican friars founded the Saint Dominic Church (also called San Pietro Church) in Ban Portuket in late sixteenth century and then Portuguese Jesuits built the San Paolo Church nearby around 1606. As the Portuguese maritime power declined, however, Catholic parishes in Ayutthaya was taken over by French priests. French missionaries from Paris Foreign Missions Society founded the Saint Joseph Church, also a seminary, in 1662 on Ayutthaya's southern moat four kilometers to the west of Ban Portuket. Saint Joseph Church was also the residence of the Apostolic Vicars of Siam, who held authorities over Catholic subjects in Siam, majority of whom were Portuguese. In 1767, Pierre Brigot the titular bishop of Taclan had been the vicar apostolic of Siam, residing at Saint Joseph Church. The Portuguese in Siam had much intermixed with local Siamese population as they were called by the terms "creoles" and "mestizos". They served as mercenaries, musketeers and cannoneers, operating the firearms and artillery.

Due to the fall of Ming dynasty and increasing trade activities between Siam and Qing China in early eighteenth century, a large number of Chinese people arrived to settle in Siam. First arrivals were the Hokkien Chinese merchants, who settled on the southeastern corner of Ayutthaya near Pomphet fort known as Naikai (內街) inside of Ayutthayan city wall, turning that place into an affluent marketplace. Less-privileged Teochew Chinese later arrivals were relegated to rowdy, disreputable Khlong Suan Phlu outside of the wall to the southeast.

The Ayutthayan court had enlisted the local Chinese and the Portuguese to defend the city. When the Burmese fleet approached the southern facet of Ayutthaya in November 1766, the Portuguese at Ban Portuket were left isolated from the city fort, becoming an enclave of resistance against the Burmese. On 13 November 1766, the Burmese attacked Saint Joseph Church but were repelled by Catholic defenders. "They sabred a crowd of Burmese who had attempted to storm the college." By February 1767, the Chinese stockade at Khlong Suan Phlu and the Portuguese camps at Ban Portuket were the main Siamese defense line to the south. However, a group of 300 Chinese mercenaries took advantage of the situation by going to plunder the Wat Phra Phutthabat temple in Saraburi to the east of Ayutthaya – one of the kingdom's most sacred religious sites. Those Chinese burnt down the Mondop or the main building containing the Buddha Footprint, stripping away gold and silver. The Siamese court, in this deplorable state, could do nothing about this incident. King Ekkathat ordered Luang Aphaiphiphat, the Chinese headman, to search and return only some amount of gold and silver taken from the temple.

In February 1767, the Chinese at Khlong Suan Phlu sailed their war-junk fleet against Burmese towers to the south along the Chao Phraya River, coming between the towers of Mingyi Zeyathu and Nanda Udein Kyawdin, leading to the Battle of Khlong Suan Phlu. However, the Burmese had laid an iron chain across the river to prevent the passage. Chinese–Siamese war-junks were halted by the iron chains and those large ships crowded on the point. The two Burmese commanders then poured cannon fires from their towers onto the stuck Chinese–Siamese fleet, destroying and annihilating the fleet. Burmese forces from nearby towers arrived to finish the battle. Many Chinese and Siamese were killed and drowned in this battle.

=== Failed peace negotiation ===
Being restricted by the siege, the remaining Ayutthaya defenders were deprived of their food and manpower resources, while the Burmese accumulated plenty of those. Ayutthaya citizens began to die from starvation, and the city fell into anarchy as plundering and robbery were rampant. More Siamese people from Ayutthaya simply left to surrender to the Burmese besiegers, who were kept informed about the situation inside Ayutthaya through waves of incoming refugees. In February 1766, the Siamese put a great cannon called Dvaravati, which was regarded as the ancient guardian of the city, on the northern wall of Ayutthaya to fire upon the Burmese camps of Nemyo Thihapate. However, the Siamese were unskilled to handle this out-of-use ancient cannon. The first fire round was incapacitated and dropped short on the city moat. The second round was too strong and shot far off the target. For the Siamese believed that guardian spirits resided in the cannons, failure of the cannon to function implied that the supernatural protectors were not in favor of Ayutthaya's defenders. Meanwhile, Burmese cannons from their battle towers effectively inflicted damage on Ayutthaya, killing many people. Under these circumstances, King Ekkathat of Ayutthaya decided to seek peace. In February 1767, Ekkathat sent Phraya Kalahom, the Minister of Military, to present negotiation terms to Maha Nawrahta. Burmese and Thai chronicles gave their own versions of this peace negotiation attempt.

- Burmese chronicles stated that the Siamese envoy recalled that, in the past, Siam had regularly sent elephants and horses as tributes to Burma and the two kingdoms had been in peace terms. However, the relations were interrupted by the Mon insurrection of Lower Burma so Siamese missions could not go to Burma. Then Siam offered to resume friendly tributes and asked for peace. However, Maha Nawrahta demanded total surrender of Ayutthaya, citing that the war situation differed greatly between Burma and Siam like between a light plant seed and a viss weight, in which Burma was sure to prevail and Siam was sure to lose and the peace terms should not be negotiated from equal footing but rather with Siam as the inferior.
- Thai chronicles stated that the Siamese envoy asked why the King of Ava of the western kingdom sent forces to march onto the eastern kingdom of Siam without a just cause, killing innocent lives in the process. The Burmese replied that Siam had used to send tributes to Burma but then Siam had abandoned the traditional tributary obligations to Burma so they came to punish Siam.

Nevertheless, neither Burma nor Siam was satisfied with each other's responses. The peace negotiation apparently failed and the war continued.

=== Death of Maha Nawrahta ===
During the Burmese invasion of Ayutthaya in 1765–1767, there were two Bogyoke or Burmese grand commanders – Maha Nawrahta of the Tavoy column and Nemyo Thihapate of the Chiang Mai Lanna column. However, Maha Nawrahta somehow acted as de facto supreme commander of all besieging Burmese armies in Ayutthaya. Five days after the failed Burmese–Siamese peace talks, Maha Nawrahta died from illness in February 1766. Maha Nawrahta was believed to be cremated in interred in a pagoda in Wat Siguk temple to the west of Ayutthaya. The death of Maha Nawrahta created a power vacuum within the Burmese ranks. According to a Thai chronicle composed in 1795, Burmese leaders of the Tavoy western column were to elect their new commander. Three candidates were picked – Nemyo Thihapate, Teingya Minkhaung and Mingyi Kamani Sanda. Mingyi Kamani Sanda was eventually selected because he was a true Burmese, while Nemyo Thihapate had a Lao (Lanna) mother and Teingya Minkhaung had a Mon mother.

Nemyo Thihapate, however, asserted his power to take over the commands of the Tavoy column anyway. Nemyo Thihapate reported the death of Maha Nawrahta to King Hsinbyushin at Ava, asking to assume the commands of all Burmese forces in Ayutthaya. Owing to the increasingly threatening Sino–Burmese conflicts, Hsinbyushin gave orders to Nemyo Thihapate to hasten the conquest of Ayutthaya in order to divert the Burmese forces to the Sino–Burmese front. He appointed Minye Minhla Uzana the governor of Martaban as the new Bogyoke of the Tavoy column, not allowing Thihapate to assume absolute control. Hsinbyushin also sent an additional force of 3,000 men to accompany Minye Minhla Uzana to Ayutthaya. This new regiment left Ava on 18 February 1767 (5th waning of Tabodwe 1128 ME). However, new regiment under Minye Minhla Uzana took time to reach Ayutthaya. Ne Myo Thihapate now assumed the role of sole commander-in-chief. According to Prince Damrong, the death of Maha Nawrahta was detrimental to the Siamese as it allowed the Burmese forces to be united under one single command of Nemyo Thihapate.

=== Final battles ===
By March 1766, there were four main Siamese defense points on the southern front; the Siamese regiment at Wat Chai Watthanaram temple to the southwest of Ayutthaya, Catholic encampment at Saint Joseph Church on the southern moat under leadership of Pierre Brigot, Portuguese resistance at Ban Portuket to the southeast of Ayutthaya and Chinese encampment at Khlong Suan Phlu also to the southeast of Ayutthaya, including the abandoned Dutch trade factory. Satpagyon Bo the Burmese commander led his 500 men to attack the Siamese at Wat Chai Watthanaram, who fell after nine days of resistance. Another Burmese commander Uttama Thinka Kyaw led his 500 men to attack the Chinese camps at the old Dutch factory. Both the Chinese and the Portuguese shared their manpower along the defense line and combined their forces to resist the Burmese but to no avail. After resisting for about a month, the Chinese camps fell in mid-March 1767. The Portuguese camp of Ban Portuket also fell on 21 March. The Burmese held Catholic priests as hostages, demanding the surrender of Pierre Brigot, the apostolic vicar of the Saint Joseph seminary, promising not to destroy Christian churches. Brigot gave himself in to the Burmese, who did not keep their promises and burnt down the Saint Dominic, San Paolo and Saint Joseph churches on 23 March 1767. The last Siamese defense line on the southern front eventually collapsed.

In late March 1767, Nemyo Thihapate chose the northeastern corner of Ayutthaya at Huaraw as where he would dig the tunnel to penetrate Ayutthaya. Thihapate ordered the construction of three forts at Huaraw, each with a circumference of 800 tas and a height of ten taung (about 4.5 meters). Each of the Burmese commanders, Satpagyon Bo, Thitsein Bo and Thado Mindin, each with 2,000 men, was assigned to each fort. The three forts were to supervise and to guard the tunnel digging into Ayutthaya. The Burmese dug five tunnels to reach the underlying root of the Ayutthaya walls. Chameun Si Sorrarak (called Bra Mundari in Burmese chronicles), who was a brother of Ekkathat's favorite concubine, volunteered to take out the Burmese. The Siamese forces of ten thousand men descended onto the three Burmese forts like a swarm of bees. The Battle of Huaraw was intense as Siamese soldiers stepped on the dead bodies of their comrades to climb their portable ladders into the forts. A large number of Siamese managed to enter the forts, which nearly capitulated to the Siamese. However, Burmese reinforcements arrived in time just to repel the Siamese. 800 Siamese men died in this battle, while another 200 were captured and Chameun Si Sorrarak himself returned to the Ayutthaya citadel.

== Fall of Ayutthaya (April 1767) ==
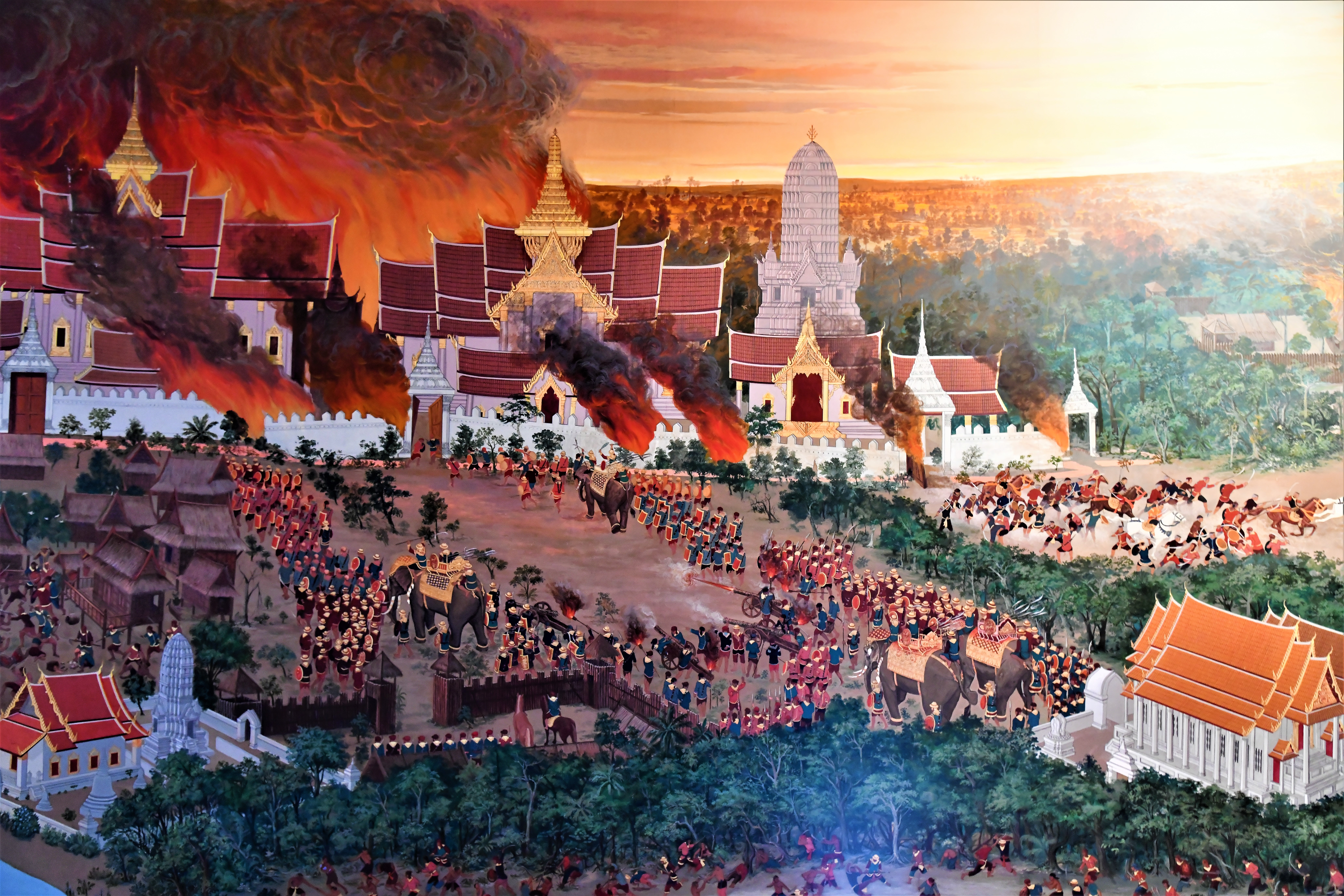
Fall of Ayutthaya city

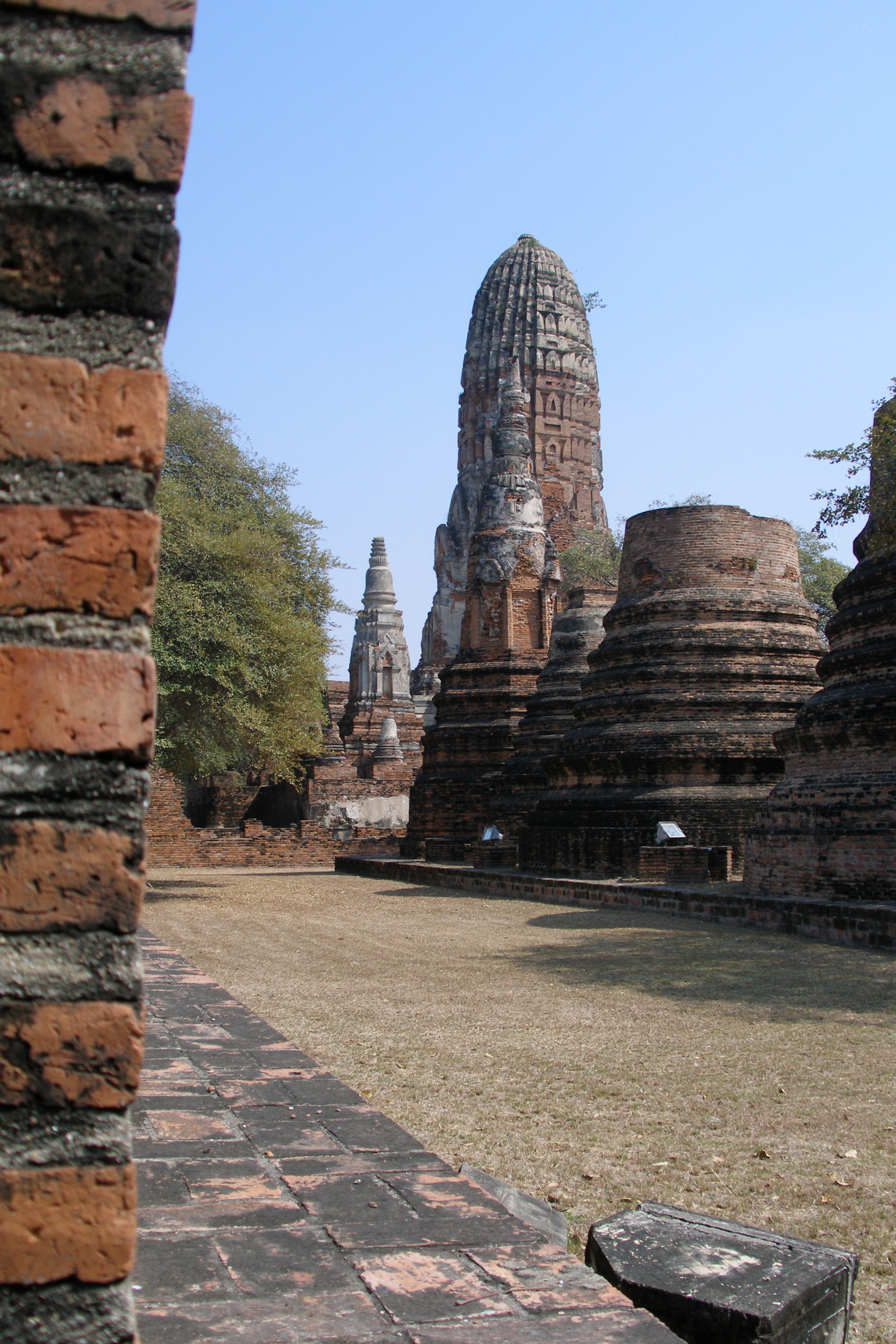
Ruins of Ayutthaya

By early April 1767, Nemyo Thihapate had dug five tunnels into Ayutthaya but Ekkathat was still persistent in his stand against the Burmese besiegers. Before the eventual fall of Ayutthaya, Thai chronicles recorded supernatural omens in Ayutthaya pertaining to the event;

- The great Buddha image of Wat Phanan Choeng temple cried in tears.
- The chest of a Buddha image at Wat Phra Si Sanphet temple was split and separated into two parts.
- A crow pierced itself to death at the top of a spire at Wat Ratchaburana temple, crying in pain.
- A statue of King Naresuan made loud, angry trampling sounds.

Nemyo Thihapate then resolved to end the war once and for all by putting wood logs onto the roots of the Ayutthaya city wall at the northeastern portion at Huaraw, setting fire to the wall roots through the tunnels at 4 pm on 7 April 1767 to undermine the wall. The northeastern section of the Ayutthayan wall was brought down by the fires underneath at 8 pm, and the Burmese troops, supported by artillery fire, stormed the walls. (Harvey reports the date as 28 March, but the Konbaung Hset Chronicle gives Tuesday, 5th waxing of Tabaung 1128 ME, which is 7 April.) The attackers finally breached the walls and entered the city. The remaining Siamese forces of 10,000 men under Chaophraya Phrakhlang and Phraya Kalahom still fought on inside the city but were eventually overwhelmed. Indiscriminate slaughter followed. Everything in sight was put to the torch. Thai chronicles stated that the houses, temples and palaces were all burnt down so illuminated that it looked like daytime. Thai sources also commented that the Burmese tortured and killed Ayuthayan citizens to extort their money and wealth. Burmese and Thai sources give different accounts on the death of Ekkathat, the last king of Ayutthaya;

- Burmese chronicles state that King Ekkathat fled from his palace to a western gate of Ayutthaya. There, however, Ekkathat was killed by a random gunshot. The Burmese later found the royal body of Ekkathat lying near the western gate.
- Thai chronicles state that Ekkathat managed to escape the falling city with his two royal pages and sought refuge near Wat Sangkhawat temple to the south. However, the pages soon abandoned the king, who died alone from starvation a week later.

The Burmese hastily buried the body of King Ekkathat in front of the Mongkhol Bophit temple. Burmese conquerors also captured other members of the Ayutthayan Ban Phlu Luang dynasty;

- Four queens of Ekkathat, including his chief queen Vimolwat and other royal concubines and palace ladies, numbering to 869 women.
- Twelve brothers and half-brothers of Ekkathat, including Uthumphon the temple king.
- Fourteen sisters and half-sisters of Ekkathat, including Princess Suriya, Princess Inthasudawadi, Princess Kunthon and Princess Mongkut.
- Three sons of Ekkathat, including Prince Praphaikuman and Prince Suthat.
- Four daughters of Ekkathat
- Fourteen other male relatives and fourteen other female relatives of Ekkathat
- Four children of the late Prince Thammathibet.

The Burmese captured the Ayutthayan nobility, including Chaophraya Phrakhlang, the Samuha Nayok or Prime Minister, Phraya Kalahom, the Minister of Military, Phraya Ratchaphakdi, the Royal Treasurer, Phraya Yommaraj of the Police Bureau, and Phraya Phollathep, the Minister of Agriculture. Nemyo Thihapate returned to Phosamton to the north and pressed his subordinates not to keep Siamese war booty to themselves and to surrender all to him. The Burmese seized gold, silver, precious gems, fine royal clothes, elephants, horses, Buddhist Tripitaka scriptures, treatises on astrology and medicine. The Burmese also found a huge number of unused firearms, including 10,000 flintlock guns, 3,550 small cannons, two large cannons and 50,000 cannon shells. It was then decided that, due to large number of the firearms, the Burmese would only take those with fine qualities and destroy the rest. Siamese firearms and cannons that were not taken were either exploded or dumped into the water.

Even images of the Buddha were hacked for the gold with which they were coated. The Phra Si Sanphet Buddha image, which stood about sixteen meters tall, cast in 1500 AD and had been the palladium of Ayutthaya kingdom for centuries, was destroyed and molten down by the Burmese. 30,000 Ayutthayan captives were forcibly relocated to the Burmese capital in Ava. Nemyo Thihapate distributed the Ayutthayan war captives to his ranks, with Tathmu commanders receiving 100 families each, Sitke commanders receiving 75 families each, Nakan officials receiving 50 families each, Tatye receiving five families each and ordinary soldiers receiving two families each. The Burmese brought Uthumphon and hundreds of Siamese nobles and members of the royal family to be resettled in Burma. Virtually nothing was left of the 14th-century Ayutthaya Grand Palace, home to 33 kings of five dynasties, or the glittering Sanphet Prasat, used to welcome foreign envoys and state visitors. The Siamese king was found dead, identified by his brother Uthumphon. The city of Ayutthaya, with a population said to rival contemporary London or Paris, was reduced to ashes by the "seemingly unstoppable Burmese military machine."

The centuries-old Ayutthaya Kingdom had come to an end. Siam was forcibly plunged into anarchy and civil war with the disappearance of a central authority.

== Analysis ==
=== Contrasting Burma and Siam ===
Continental Southeast Asia, in the eighteenth century, was characterized by the decline of central authorities, political fragmentation and decline of manpower control. In the course of the eighteenth century, major polities, centers of the Mandalas, underwent tumultuous, destructive changes, which resulted in political reconstitution as new groups of elites rose to power. Burma was the first kingdom to undergo this change, followed by Siam and then Vietnam. The Burmese had been in continuous wars and infighting since 1740. The fall of the Burmese Toungoo dynasty at the hands of the Mons of the Restored Hanthawaddy Kingdom in 1752 allowed the new, more efficient and competent Konbaung regime of King Alaungpaya to rise. King Alaungpaya, his commanders and fighting forces fought through the Mons and the French in Lower Burma, the Shans in the east and Manipur in the northwest, gaining military experiences. Alaungpaya instituted military reforms that allowed more efficient conscription. Burmese elite was taken over by a new class of military men. By the time of Alaungpaya's invasion of Ayutthaya in 1759, Burma under the new Konbaung dynasty had become a consolidated militaristic power.

Siam, on the other hand, had not faced serious external threats since the Burmese Siamese War of 1661–1662. Siamese defense system had been largely in disuse since then. Siam had been in the general state of the decline of central authority and decline of manpower control. Due to the flourishing trade with Qing China, Siamese people avoided military conscriptions in order to partake in other economic activities. Also, the rising powers of the princes meant that they accumulated Phrai Som or private princely servants at the expense of Phrai Luang or direct royal servants available for defense. Ayutthayan court could do little to fix these problems, and Siamese defense went into deterioration and decline, rendering Siam weak and defenseless against the energetic Burmese military leaders and personnel.

In traditional Siamese bureaucracy, civil and military duties were not clearly defined. Civilian administrators were also expected to perform military duties like commanding armies in wartime. During the Burmese Invasion of Siam in 1765–1766, Siamese quasi-civilian ministers, including Chaophraya Phrakhlang the Prime Minister and Minister of Trade and Foreign Affairs, Phraya Rattathibet, the Minister of Palace Affairs, Phraya Yommaraj, the Head of Police Bureau, and Phraya Phonlathep, the Minister of Lands and Agriculture, were all recruited to lead Siamese armies against the Burmese commanders, who had been in their top strategic and military competencies. Only Kalahom had direct military duties but the power and role of the Kalahom had been greatly reduced. After the fall of Ayutthaya in 1767, Siam would also experience a similar post-destruction phenomenon as the new class of military personnel, under the new Thonburi regime of King Taksin, took power in the new militaristic Siamese regime of Thonburi, renewing and valorizing Siamese military energy and prowess.

=== Lessons from the War of 1760 ===
King Alaungpaya took a pilgrimage from his royal seat Shwebo in July 1759 down south to make merits at the Shwedagon Pagoda in Rangoon. After learning of Siamese provocations, Alaungpaya declared his plan and schedule to invade and conquer Ayutthaya in September 1759. However, Alaungpaya spent the majority of his time in the early dry season making merits and dealing with the British at Negrais. Alaungpaya and his Burmese armies could only leave Rangoon in late December 1759. Alaungpaya had to choose the long, indirect route, going to conquer Tavoy, which had been an independent city-state after the fall of the Toungoo dynasty in 1752, in December 1759. Alaungpaya and his Burmese forces marched a long way from Tavoy to Mergui, entering through the Singkhon Pass into the coast of Gulf of Siam, capturing Western Siamese towns, taking the whole three months from December 1759 to March 1760 before reaching the outskirts of Ayutthaya, leaving the Burmese only one month to force Ayutthaya to surrender before the arrival of rainy season in May, in which the Burmese would be obliged to retreat due to inhospitable swampy conditions of the Ayutthayan suburbs in the wet season.

Ayutthaya has a traditional strategy of passive stand in the formidable Ayutthaya citadel against the invaders, relying on the impressive walls built by French architects of the seventeenth century and the arrival of the wet rainy season to ward off the besiegers. King Ekkathat called for provincial peripheral governors to abandon their cities and take their forces to defend Ayutthaya, focusing on central defense, not intending to preserve outlying towns. The Burmese then marched through and conquered the Siamese outlying provincial towns without much effort or resistance. Alaungpaya reached the outskirts of Ayutthaya in late March 1760, attacking the Siamese royal city. However, with abundant food and weapon supplies, Ayutthaya could not be forced to surrender in one month. Eventually, Alaungpaya fell ill in mid-April 1760. He called a war council to discuss next actions. His son Prince Myedu (later King Hsinbyushin) and his vanguard commander Minkhaung Nawrahta suggested general retreat. Minkhaung Nawrahta pointed out the flaws of Alaungpaya's plan to conquer Ayutthaya, saying that the Burmese king had started the campaign too late, not having enough time to coerce Ayutthaya to surrender and that the king had spent time in the indirect, long route, going through Tenasserim. Minkhaung Mawrahta suggested that, in order to traditionally conquer Ayutthaya within a year, the Burmese should start very early in the dry season, finishing all Siamese peripheral cities by December or January and should embrace a shorter, more direct route towards Ayutthaya. Alaungpaya and his Burmese contingents retreated. The traditional Siamese strategy of passive defense worked, albeit for the last time, postponing the fall of Ayutthaya for seven years.

Prince Myedu, who had acted as the vanguard commander for his father, Alaungpaya, in his campaign in Siam in 1759–1760, all the way from Tavoy to Ayutthaya, became familiar with traditional Siamese strategy and tactics. Prince Myedu ascended the Burmese throne as King Hsinbyushin in December 1763. The new Burmese king had observed both Burmese and Siamese strategy, tactics and flaws, reflecting and forming his own strategy and plan to conquer Ayutthaya. Even though Hsinbyushin did not personally set foot into Siam during the Burmese invasion of 1765–1767, his commander Maha Nawrahta seemed to convey his strategy well. Maha Nawrahta himself, formerly as Minhla Thiri, had participated under the command of Prince Myedu during the Battle of Talan River against the Siamese in March 1760. Maha Nawrahta himself also had experience in waging war against Siam. Maha Nawrahta marched his Tavoy column from Tavoy through a very direct route into Central Siam in October 1765.

Siam, on the other hand, did not do much from the Burmese invasion of 1760. After the Burmese retreat, Siam returned to the usual divisive court politics. In February 1761, about 600 of Mon refugee rebels at Nakhon Nayok, who were armed with only melee wooden sticks, managed to repel Ayutthayan royal forces of thousands men. This showcased how ineffective Siamese military had become. The return of fugitive Prince Kromma Muen Thepphiphit to Siam in 1762 shifted the Siamese king Ekkathat's attention onto that issue. King Ekkathat ordered the placement of gun stands and the preparation of flammable substances on the Ayutthayan wall against the upcoming attackers, but these did not have a meaningful impact on the defense. There were no military reforms or substantial improvements that would enable Siam to stand against energetic Burmese invaders, who were in their top military form.

The Burmese command innovated in their strategy to conquer Ayutthaya. Hsinbyushin decided that the campaign to conquer Siam, not accomplishable in one year, should span several years in order to have enough time to drain Ayutthaya of its resources. The Burmese strategy was to circumvent Siamese passive defense, including the great wall of Ayutthaya and the wet season. When the rainy season came in mid-1766, Maha Nawrahta insisted that the Burmese besiegers should not retreat but stand their ground, enduring Siamese wet swamps in order to impose pressure on Ayutthaya. The Siamese, not expecting the Burmese to stay during the wet season, became depleted of their resources. The only obstacle for the Burmese was the wall of Ayutthaya. In January 1767, Maha Nawrahta ordered the construction of twenty-seven battle towers surrounding Ayutthaya in an effort to alleviate the protectiveness of the walls. After the death of Maha Nawrahta from illness, Nemyo Thihapate ordered the digging of underground tunnels to circumvent the walls of Ayutthaya in March 1767. Through the tunnels, the Burmese were able to set fire to the roots of the walls, causing a portion of the Ayutthaya wall to collapse. The wall, the last remaining defense of Ayutthaya, was eventually breached and the Burmese triumphantly accomplished their conquest of Ayutthaya through innovative strategy and persistence.

=== Implementation of strategies ===
The war came near the peak of Konbaung military power. (Their victory over the Chinese is considered the peak). According to Lieberman, the "near simultaneous victories over Siam (1767) and China (1765–1769) testified to a truly astonishing plan unmatched since Bayinnaung." To be sure, it was not so much that the Burmese had more troops or superior weapons; they did not. The main reason for the Burmese victory was the same as that in the 1760 war: the Burmese, who had been in successive wars since 1740, simply had experienced, proven, confident commanders, while most Siamese commanders had little battlefield experience except in the 1760 war.

Burmese contingents conquered Lanna in 1763–1764 and conquered Laos in 1765, allowing the Burmese to outflank the Siamese northern frontiers. Burmese conquests of Lanna and Laos are detrimental to Ayutthaya, as these newly-conquered regions provided the Burmese, under Nemyo Thihapate, with a great number of manpower resources and other provisions. A large number of Lanna and Lao men were recruited into the Burmese armies. It was the Burmese commanders' ability to lead a multi-ethnic army that consisted of regiments from various parts of the empire that made the invasion even possible. (Upper Burma, the home of Konbaung dynasty, alone could not have launched an offensive war against a more populous Siam without its policy of having the conquered lands contribute to its next war effort). In this war, the Burmese command was able to inspire (or push) their troops. Historian Harvey writes: "When roused, the men fought with spirit, vying among themselves as to who should first mount the wall" although he wonders why: "They died like flies from preventable disease, and suffered ghastly wounds for which they received no thanks from the King, as the loss of a limb, even in honorable service, disqualified a man from entering the palace: His Majesty's sight must not be sullied by reality."

Nemyo Thihapate led Burmese-Lanna regiments from Lanna to begin the invasion in August 1765, two months earlier than his peer Maha Nawrahta from Tavoy, who came later in October 1765, because the invasion route from Lanna to Ayutthaya took a longer distance than from Tavoy. Ayutthaya under King Ekkathat, compared to the previous invasion of 1760, took more attempts to repel Burmese invaders at the frontiers and periphery by sending Siamese forces to intercept the invading Burmese to the north and the west, but the relatively inexperienced and undisciplined Siamese forces could not stand against the "battle-hardened" Burmese invaders in their top form.

On the western front, the Siamese put up a substantial resistance to the Burmese at Rachaburi but they were eventually overwhelmed and defeated. When actual war came, Siamese commanders proved listless and uncoordinated. As Siamese attempts to repel Burmese at the provincial cities all failed, Siamese forces fell back and Ayutthaya assumed the traditional strategy of passive stand inside of the formidable Ayutthaya citadel. King Ekkathat, in the same manner as in the war of 1760, ordered all provincial governors to abandon their cities and took their provincial forces to defend Ayutthaya, including the valiant governor of Phetchaburi. Desperate, Ayutthaya abandoned provincial towns and its inhabitants to the invaders, focusing on preserving the royal capital of Ayutthaya itself as the Siamese could not resist the Burmese in Western and Northern provincial fronts. By late 1765, most of Siamese Western and Northern provincial towns had been conquered by the Burmese. The Burmese then utilized their new conquests by conscripting local Western and Northern Siamese men into their own ranks, further enhancing Burmese numerical strength. The Siamese themselves, having no hope in central authority, eagerly joined the Burmese ranks simply to survive. The Burmese commanders were able to motivate their Siamese levies, which, by the battle of Ayutthaya, made up a significant minority of the Burmese army. The Siamese participation in the Burmese army highlights the fact that the war was between the rulers, not between nations.

The traditional Siamese strategy of passive defense did not work this time as the Burmese, through their innovative strategy, managed to circumvent Siamese defenses. When the wet rainy season arrived, the Burmese did not leave but stood their ground besieging Ayutthaya. Eventually, the Burmese bypassed the formidable Ayutthayan wall by simply digging a tunnel underneath it, forcefully taking Ayutthaya in April 1767. Burmese victors seized ten thousand Siamese guns in Ayutthaya, indicating that the Siamese were not skilled and militarily-trained enough or lacked adequate manpower to utilize their available firearms to their full potential, in spite of their abundant armory. Innovative strategy and military competence on Burmese side, combined with conservative strategy and military ineptitude on the Siamese side, contributed to the destructive fall and Burmese eventual conquest of Ayutthaya. Vincenzo Sangermano, an Italian missionary working in Burma during 1783–1806, around three decades after the war, described the Burmese conquest of Ayutthaya in his work Description of the Burmese Empire, published in 1833, as follows;

In the third year of his reign, Zempiuscien (Hsinbyushin) abandoned the new city of Mozzobò (Moksobo), and transported the court to Ava, the ancient residence of the Burmese kings. At the same time, he dispatched his army against the Siamese, who had refused to pay the tribute promised to his father Alomprà (Alaungpaya). Jodià (Ayutthaya), the usual residence of their kings was taken and sacked; more perhaps through the cowardice of the Siamese, or rather the dissensions that distracted the court, than by any valour on the part of the Burmese. After a short time, the conquerors abandoned the city, carrying with them an inestimable booty, together with an innumerable multitude of slaves, among whom were most of the members of the royal family. In this expedition the Burmese also obtained possession of Merghi (Mergui), and its district on the coast of Tenasserim.

Intervening Chinese attacks on Burma in the Sino-Burmese war hastened the inevitable fall of Ayutthaya, as King Hsinbyushin ordered, in January 1767, the Burmese commanders Maha Nawrahta and Nemyo Thihapate, who had been besieging Ayutthaya, to step up and finish the conquest of Ayutthaya in order to divert forces to the Chinese front. However, the Chinese invasions of Burma happening in the same time as Burmese attack on Ayutthaya was a total coincidence. There was no actual cooperation between China and Siam and China did not lend any military support to Siam before 1777. The idea that China and Siam cooperated against Burma during 1765–1767 is a misconception. Given geographical distance, China was not aware about Burmese invasion of Siam and Siamese court did not know about Chinese invasions of Burma. Yang Yingju, the supreme commander of Chinese forces in Burma, proposed in May 1767 for Siam to cooperate with China to invade Burma from another direction, not knowing that Ayutthaya had already been reduced to ruins by the Burmese. Only when a report from Hà Tiên came in December 1768 that China became aware of Ayutthaya's destruction. Burmese preoccupation with Chinese wars during 1766–1769 indeed gave Siam an opportunity to resurge under the new Thonburi regime but it was an unintended effect.

== Subsequent events ==
=== Burmese withdrawal ===
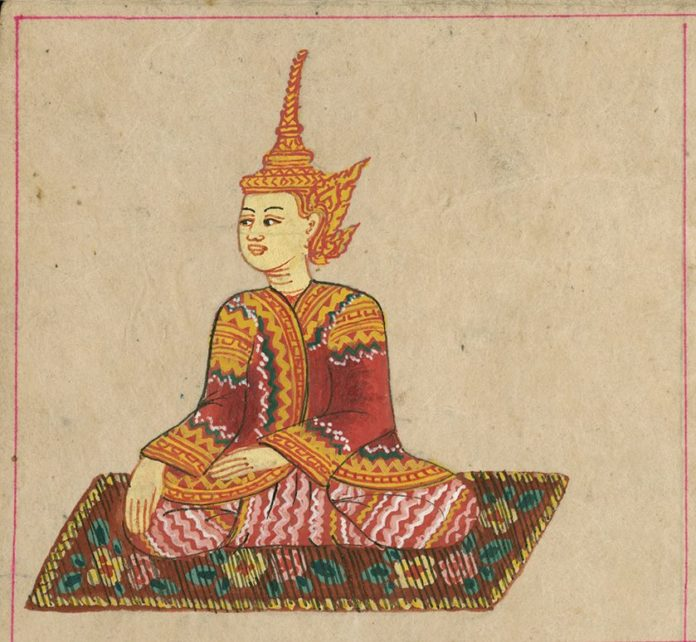
Burmese Parabaik manuscript depicting either of Siamese kings Ekkathat or Uthumphon.

After the victorious Burmese conquests of "Yawnaka Ayokza" (Lanna and Ayutthaya), Nemyo Thihapate the grand Burmese commander ordered celebrations to be held in Ayutthaya. Performing dance styles of Burma, the Mons, Tavoy, Tenasserim, the Shans, Lanna, Laos and Siam were arranged. During the feast, Nemyo Thihapate declared before his subordinates that the Chinese Emperor sent armies to invade Burma but all were repelled by valiant Burmese armies and commanders, suffering heavy losses. Conquerors of Ayutthaya should, therefore, hurriedly finished their mission in Siam by taking Ayutthayan elites and inhabitants back to Burma in order to join their comrades on the Chinese front to pursue further more glory in battlefields. Ayutthaya's city walls and fortifications should also be destroyed and dismantled.

After occupying Ayutthaya for two months, Nemyo Thihapate and Burmese victors finally left Ayutthaya on 6 June 1767 (9th waxing of Nayon 1129 ME). Nemyo Thihapate sent Siamese captives, treasures and weapons to Martaban as stopping entrepôt. Siamese war spoils were divided into two routes to be transported;

- Nemyo Thihapate himself led the Siamese elites, including the temple king Uthumphon and other courtiers, northward to Uthaithani in order to go Martaban, going through modern Thung Yai Naresuan Wildlife Sanctuary at Umphang. According to the account of Anthony Goyatan, an Armenian residence in Ayutthaya, recorded by the Dutch at Batavia one year later in April 1768, Chaophraya Phrakhlang the Siamese Prime Minister committed suicide on the way. Nemyo Thihapate met Minye Minhla Uzana, the new Burmese commander intended to replace Maha Nawrahta, at Tak.
- Siamese commoners and weapons were carried by riparian boats to the south and west, leaving at Kanchanaburi. A Siamese man named Thong-in was assigned at Thonburi as the Burmese agent to occupy the area. Other Siamese cannons were painstakingly dragged and transported through the Three Pagodas Pass, eventually reaching Martaban.

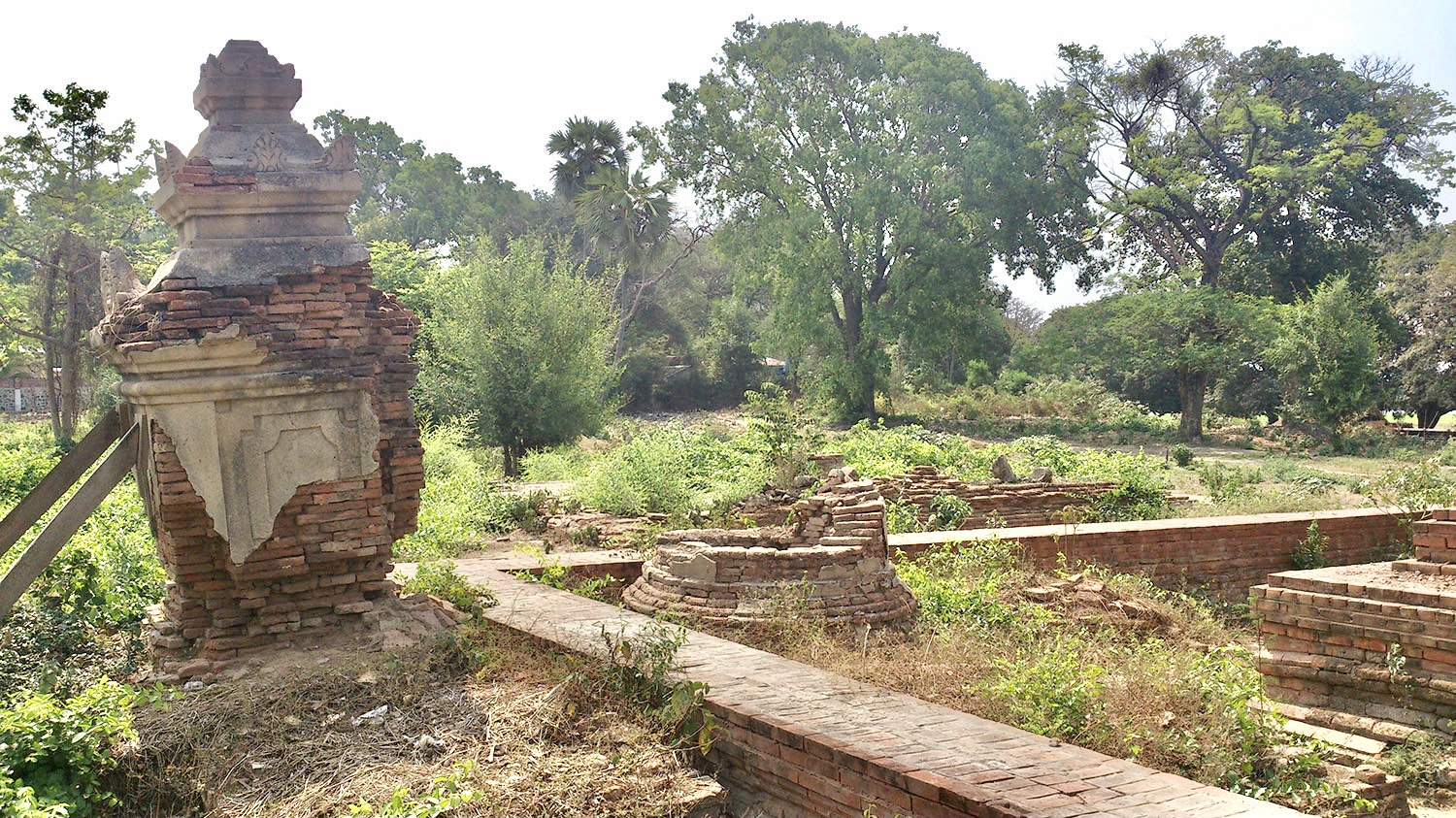
Dilapidated chedi at Linzingon cemetery in modern Amarapura, Mandalay near U Bein bridge is believed to house the cremated remains of Siamese temple king Uthumphon.

From Martaban, Siamese captives and treasures were transported further to Ava, the Burmese capital. Nemyo Thihapate and his retinue arrived at Ava in August 1767. Siamese captives were given to the Burmese king Hsinbyushin, who granted Siamese people and dignitaries to live the out their lives in Ava and Sagaing. Siamese princesses and court ladies entered the Burmese royal harem. Burmese chronicles give the staggering number of Siamese captives as 100,000 souls, while Thai chronicles give the modest number of 30,000 people. When the Burmese king Bodawpaya moved the Burmese capital to Amarapura in 1783, the temple king Uthumphon and other Siamese elites moved with him to settle in Yawahaeng (Rahaeng) village in Amarapura. Uthumphon spent his life as Buddhist monk in Burma for about three decades until his death in 1796 at Amarapura, where he was cremated. His remains are believed to be buried at Linzingon cemetery in modern Amarapura, Mandalay.

After the Third Anglo-Burmese War in 1885, the British captured Siamese cannons that had been captured from Ayutthaya in 1767 and later placed at Mandalay to Fort St.George, Madras (modern Chennai).

A Mon official named Thugyi or Suki was left in charge at Phosamton north of Ayutthaya to oversee Burmese occupation of Ayutthaya. Siamese elites who were too old or ill to take long journey were left under Burmese custody at Phosamton. A great number of Siamese people fled and took refuge in areas not reached by Burmese attacks including Chanthaburi on Eastern Siamese coastline, Nakhon Ratchasima (Khorat) in the northeast and Nakhon Si Thammarat (Ligor) in the south, even as far as Cambodia.

=== Continuing Sino-Burmese War ===
By January 1767, the situation became worsened for the Chinese in the Sino-Burmese War. Qing commander Li Shisheng was being besieged by the Burmese under Maha Thiha Thura at Longchuan. Yang Yingju, the Viceroy of Yungui and grand commander of the campaign, opened negotiation with the Burmese while also sending false reports to the Chinese Emperor Qianlong, claiming that the Qing forces had securing great victories and had killed many Burmese. Qianlong soon found out the truth. As the Chinese had not yet been aware of the violent fall of Ayutthaya in April 1767, Yang Yingju proposed in May 1767 that Siam Ayutthaya should also cooperate with Qing to invade Burma from another front – the proposal that Emperor Qianlong dismissed as "absolutely ridiculous", not wanting to show weakness by asking a tributary state for help. Eventually, both Yang Yingju and Li Shisheng were arrested to be executed at Beijing. Only when China sent inspectors to Hà Tiên more than a year later in December 1768 that the Chinese eventually learned of the fall of Ayutthaya at the hands of Burma.

==== Third Chinese Invasion of Burma (1767–1768) ====
Emperor Qianlong became determined to conquer Burma to uphold dignity. After two failed invasions of Burma, Emperor Qianlong began to employ Manchu bannermen into the war instead of relying solely on Han Chinese Green Standard. Mingrui (明瑞) was appointed as the new viceroy of Yungui and new commander of the Burmese front. Mingrui organized 25,000 men, 3,000 Manchus and the rest were Han Chinese. The Qing forces would attack Burma from Yongchang in two directions, via Hsenwi and Bhamo, to inflict two-pronged pincer attack on the Burmese royal capital of Ava, intending to conquer Burma;

- Mingrui himself would lead the Qing armies of 17,000 to invade Burma from Wanding into Hsenwi.
- E'erjing'er (額爾景額) would lead the troops of 8,000 men to invade via the Tiebi Pass, attacking Bhamo

To reinforce the Chinese front, he recalled from Siam a major portion of the army, which arrived back to Ava with the Siamese captives in July 1767. Burmese responses to this Chinese invasion were;

- Maha Thiha Thura, with his 20,000 men, would defend Hsenwi against Qing attacks.
- Nemyo Sithu, with his 10,000 men, would station at Momeik to receive the incoming Chinese from Bhamo.

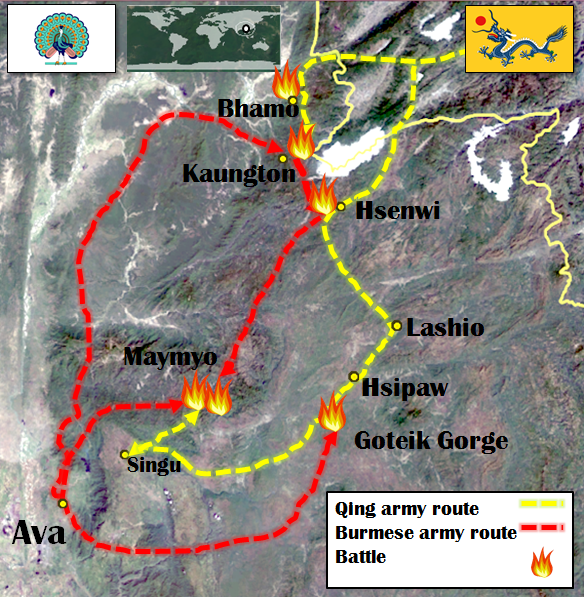
Chinese invasion routes during the third invasion of Burma in 1767–68; Mingrui with majority of the Qing forces invaded through Theinni to Ava, while his colleague E'erjing'er invaded Bhamo.

Mingrui, with his forces, captured Hsenwi in November 1767 and proceeded to defeat the Burmese forces of Maha Sithu in the Battle of Goteik gorge as the first major Qing victory in the war, inflicting heavy losses onto the Burmese. With the Qing forces under Mingrui approaching the Burmese capital reaching the town of Singu just thirty miles north of Ava, Burmese king Hsinbyushin then realized the gravity of situation but did not panic. Mingrui, however, failed to materialize his plan because his colleague E'erjing'er, who was held back at Bhamo, could not get through to formidable Kaungton stockade under Balamindin. E'erjing'er himself fell ill and died and his duty was taken over by his brother E'erdeng'er (額爾登額).

Mingrui decided to retreat. Maha Thiha Thura employed his tactics to close off the exit to entrap the Qing forces and to disrupt the supply lines, rendering the Qing trapped and starved inside of Burma as Maha Thiha Thura and Nemyo Sithu retook Hsenwi from the Qing. Maha Thiha Thura also inflicted defeat on the retreating Qing forces in the Battle of Maymyo in March 1768. The pursuing Burmese followed and attacked the retreating Qing army at Mongyu, in which a great number of Qing soldiers were killed, many Qing commanders died and Mingrui himself cut his Manchu queue giving to the emperor and hanged himself on a tree in suicide. After learning of third Qing defeat and death of Mingrui, Emperor Qianlong was furious, ordering the execution of E'erdeng'er through slow-slicing.

==== Fourth Chinese Invasion of Burma (1769) ====
Despite three defeats, the Qing Emperor Qianlong did not give up. In April 1768, Qianlong assigned Fuheng, chief state councilor and uncle of Mingrui, the new leader of the campaign. Fuheng rethought the strategy, preferring to directly attack Ava through the Irrawaddy River. Intending to stage a surprise attack, Fuheng led the Qing forces of 40,000 men into Burma in October 1769, before the conclusion of the rainy season. Fuheng sent Qing forces to seize the Shan states of Mogaung and Mohnyin, gaining access to the Irrawaddy. The saobwas of these two states joined the Chinese. Fuheng then employed his carpenters to build a navy and to build a large stockade at Shwenyaungbin in contest to the Burmese Kaungton stockade.

Fuheng the chief state councilor and brother-in-law of Qing Emperor Qianlong was assigned to lead the campaign to invade Burma in 1769 but eventually succumbed to malaria and died the same year.

Burmese king Hsinbyushin responded by sending 52,000 men under Maha Thiha Thura to relieve Bhamo and sending navy force of 12,000 men under Nemyo Sithu to deal with the Chinese navy at Mogaung. Nemyo Sithu and his Burmese navy sailed upstream Irrawaddy to attack and destroy Fuheng's fleet, as the Burmese possessed better war-canoes and firearms. Maha Thiha Thura took the Qing's Shwenyaungbin fortress in November 1769, attacked the supply line and entrapped the Qing again. Eventually, malaria ravaged the Qing ranks. Many Qing commanders fell ill and died. Fuheng himself became ill and incapacitated, entrusting the command to his deputy Agui (阿桂).

Agui, who had been skeptical about possible Chinese success in Burma, sent a letter to Maha Thiha Thura for negotiation. Burmese commanders did not want to negotiate, saying that Burma was gaining an upper hand but Maha Thiha Thura insisted, saying that, despite Burmese victories, the Qing would send more waves of armies to invade Burma in the future. Maha Thiha Thura sent senior official Nemyo Maha Thuya as Burmese delegate to talk peace terms with Agui and Ha Guoxing (哈國興), who were Qing representatives, resulting in the Treaty of Kaungton on 22 December 1769, in which the Qing promised to return the five fugitive Shan saophas to Burma, accepting Burmese suzerainty over these Shan princedoms in exchange for Burma returning Chinese captives and sending tributes to Beijing once every ten years, which was interpreted as 'friendly relations and exchanging embassies of good will' on equal footing in Burmese sources. Fuheng soon died afterwards.

Hsinbyushin, upon learning of Maha Thiha Thura's high-handedness in negotiating with the Qing without his approval, became infuriated. Maha Thiha Thura, knowing that the royal wrath was upon him, attempted to please his overlord the Burmese king by leading his armies to attack Manipur in early 1770. As the Burmese tributes did not come, Qianlong was enraged and ordered the shutdown of Sino–Burmese borders in 1770, disrupting the trades at the expense of local Chinese and Shan merchants. Burma and Qing China remained technically at war for the next two decades until a strange incident happened. An enigmatic "Chinese diplomatic" letter arrived from the Shans at the Burmese court in 1787, addressing the Burmese king Bodawpaya as the "West King" coming from "East King". Bodawpaya reciprocated by sending diplomatic mission to Beijing in 1788. Emperor Qianlong was joyous and surprised by the long-awaited arrival of Burmese "tributes" and consented for the Shan states of Hsenwi, Bhamo, Kengtung, Mogaung and Mohnyin to be under Burmese suzerainty, finally accepting Burmese suzerainty over these Shan states.

=== Siamese civil war and reunification ===
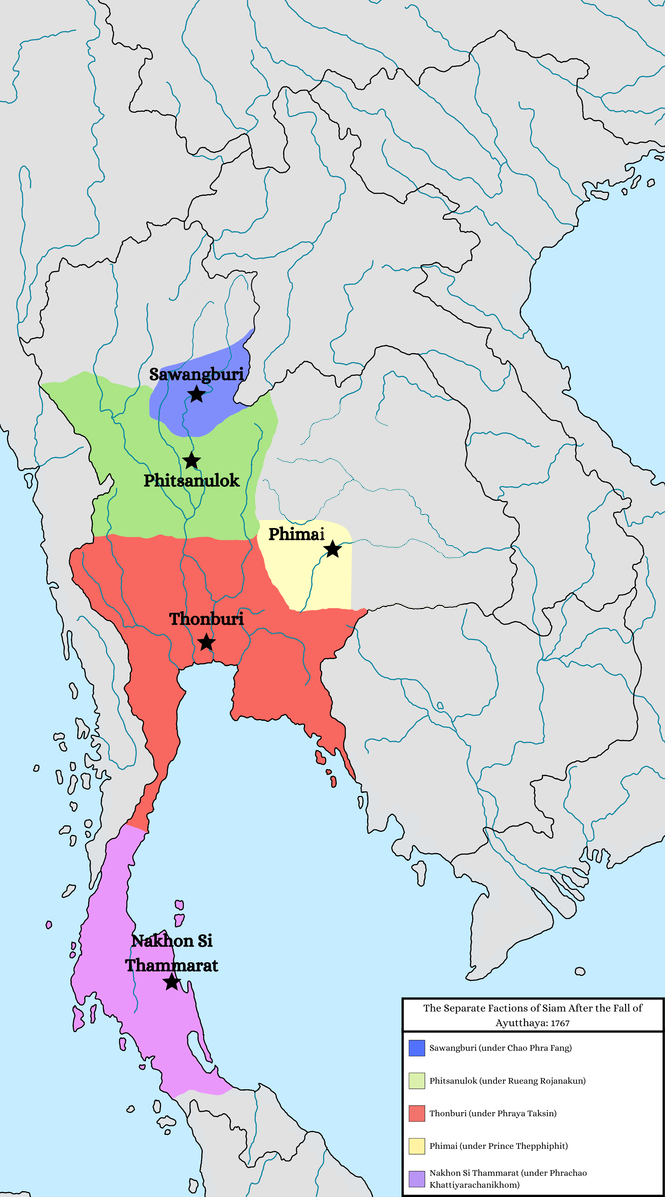
Map of the Separate Factions that emerged after the fall of Ayutthaya in 1767.

After the Fall of Ayutthaya, anarchy prevailed because of the absence of central authority. Burmese conquerors left small occupying forces at Ayutthaya and Thonburi in Lower Central Siam; the power vacuum in the other part of the kingdom was left to vying emerging local regimes such as;

- Phitsanulok regime: led by Chaophraya Phitsanulok Rueang the governor of Phitsanulok who had left Ayutthaya in late 1765 to attend the funeral of his mother and had engaged in armed struggles with the Ayutthayan Prince Chit.His area of influence included Hua Mueang Nuea or Northern Siam including Phitsanulok, Sukhothai, Sawankhalok and Phichai.
- Phimai regime: After his defeat by the Burmese at Paknam Yothaka in September 1766, Prince Kromma Muen Thepphiphit took refuge in Nakhon Ratchasima (Khorat) to the northeast, where he was captured by his political enemies. Phra Phimai the governor of Phimai proclaimed Thepphiphit a ruler "Chao Phimai" (Lord of Phimai) in Phimai. Among regional leaders, Prince Thepphiphit had the most legitimate claim to central authority because he was a member of the fallen Ayutthayan Ban Phlu Luang dynasty.
- Nakhon Si Thammarat (Ligor) regime of Southern Siam: The Burmese attacked Southern Siam as far as Chaiya but the remaining region was left unscathed. The governor of Ligor was called to lead Southern Siamese regiment to fight the Burmese in 1765 but was defeated so he was imprisoned in Ayutthaya for his failure. Phra Palat Nu, the deputy governor of Ligor, was left as caretaker governor. When Ayutthaya fell, Phra Palat Nu was declared as "Chao Nakhon" (Lord of Ligor) as ruler in Nakhon Si Thammarat. His authority spread over Southern Siam including Phatthalung, Songkhla and Phuket.
- Sawangkhaburi (Fang) regime: Chao Phra Fang (Holy Lord of Fang) was the abbot of Wat Phra Fang temple at a small town of Sawangkhaburi (also called Fang, in modern Pha Chuk, Uttaradit). He was notable for leading his armies into battle in his monk robes, despite Buddhist Vinaya forbidding monks to engage in killings and worldly affairs.
- Phraya Tak, Ayutthayan official of Teochew Chinese descent, had earlier gathered his Chinese–Siamese men and broke through the Burmese siege in January 1767 to seek for new position in Eastern Siam. Phraya Tak stayed at Rayong for five months and, upon knowing about the Fall of Ayutthaya, also declared himself a ruler. Phraya Tak moved to seize Chanthaburi in June 1767 and made it his base for reconquest of Ayutthaya, occupying whole Eastern Siamese coastline from Bangplasoi (Chonburi) to Trat.

Phraya Tak spent his time at Chanthaburi gathering men and shipbuilding. In October 1767, Phraya Tak set sail his fleet with 5,000 men from Chanthaburi to the Chao Phraya, taking Thonburi in November and proceeding to attack Ayutthaya, then under the Burmese-Mon occupier Suki who gave commands from Phosamton north of Ayutthaya. On 6 November 1767, seven months after the Fall of Ayutthaya, Phraya Tak seized Phosamton, expelled the occupying Burmese and liberated Ayutthaya. Bodily remain of King Ekkathat was exhumed and given proper cremation rituals. Phraya Tak found the old royal city of Ayutthaya to be wrecked in ruins, not suitable as his fortress against possible Burmese retaliation. Phraya Tak then chose to base himself at Thonburi south of Ayutthaya. On 28 December 1767, Phraya Tak enthroned himself as King Taksin the new King of Siam, founding the Thonburi Kingdom. In 1768, the Burmese governor of Tavoy led the forces of 2,000 men from Tavoy to attack, leading to the Battle of Bangkung (Bang Konthi, Samut Songkhram), in which Taksin repelled the invading Burmese. Meanwhile, Chao Phra Fang, despite being a rural leader, managed to take down and seize Phitsanulok regime, expanding his authority over all of Northern Siam.

After expelling the Burmese, King Taksin moved to reunify Siam as his next mission. Taksin conquered the Phimai regime in 1768, taking Prince Thepphiphit from Phimai to be executed at Thonburi. In 1769, Taksin sailed his fleet to attack and conquer Southern Siam, capturing and bringing Chao Nakhon Nu the ruler of Ligor to custody in Thonburi. Finally, in 1770, Taksin marched north to conquer Phitsanulok and Northern Siam, becoming the sole ruler of unified Siam but was unable to capture the monk-leader Chao Phra Fang who simply disappeared.

=== Burmese–Siamese War of 1774–1776 ===
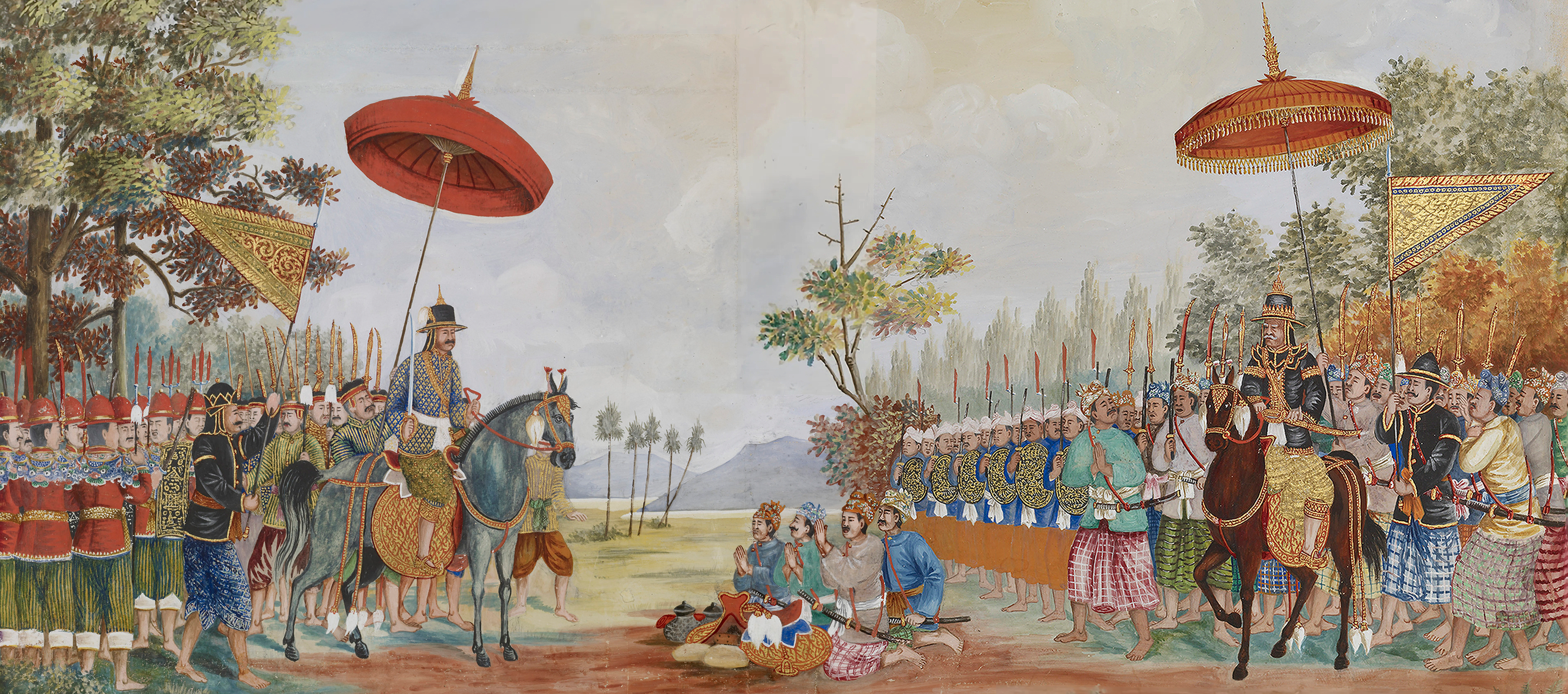
The painting depicts the meeting of a Burmese commander Maha Thiha Thura (right) and his army to Chao Phraya Chakri (Thongduang, later King Buddha Yodfa Chulalok or Rama I of Rattanakosin Kingdom), a Siamese general (left) during the siege of Phitsanulok in December 1775. This was during The Burmese–Siamese War (1775–1776).

Aside from acquiring the lower Tenasserim coast, the Burmese did not achieve their larger objectives of taming Siam and securing their peripheral regions. The actual outcome was the opposite. The new energetic Siamese leadership was now better able to support rebellions in Lan Na and Lower Burma. On the other hand, the Burmese offensive military capability was greatly diminished after two long wars with Siam and China. In the following years, Hsinbyushin was totally preoccupied with yet another Chinese invasion. While Burma was fighting off Chinese invasions, the new Siamese regime of King Taksin liberated Ayutthaya and took control of nearly all of former Ayutthaya territories with exception of the Tenasserim Coast.

Burmese invasion and conquest of Ayutthaya drastically changed Siamese geopolitical doctrine. Defense against Burma became the main objective of Siamese policies in subsequent Thonburi and Rattanakosin periods. Militarily, Siam reformed its own war strategy. Instead of passive defensive strategy, Siam focused on 'active defense', defeating enemies at frontiers and periphery rather than taking defensive position at capital, more effective manpower recruitment and mobilization. In 1774, Taksin instituted Sak Lek or conscription tattooing on Phrai commoner levies to prevent conscription evasions. After 1766–1767, Burmese armies never reached Siamese capitals again.

Ayutthaya had made mistake by allowing Burma to take control over neighboring polities of Lanna and Laos, using them for geological outflanking and vast resources. Siam then sought to take control of these neighbors, through preemptive strikes, as frontline defenses against Burmese threats. Lanna Chiang Mai had served as Burmese military base for invasions into Siam. King Taksin of Thonburi then marched his armies north to conquer Chiang Mai in late 1774. King Ong Boun of Vientiane, an ally of Burma, sensing rapid growth of Siam, informed the Burmese king about the resurgence of Siam in 1772. Hsinbyushin then initiated new campaign to reconquer Siam in two routes; the Tenasserim route and the Lanna route, in similar fashion to the previous invasion of 1765–1767. Some Burmese commanders-conquerors of Ayutthaya reprised their roles. Mingyi Kamani Sanda was made the governor of Martaban and was assigned to be in charge of invasion of Siam. However, this plan met with setbacks. In 1773 or 1774, the southern Burmese army command at Martaban provoked a mutiny by its ethnic Mon troops and put down the mutiny with "undue severity". Over 3,000 Mon troops and their families fled to Siam, and joined the Siamese army. It was mainly the warlord behavior of Burmese commanders who "were drunk with victory" that incited the rebellions. The Siamese were only helping the ready situation on the ground. In Lanna, Taksin's expedition to Chiang Mai coincided with native Lanna rebellion against Burmese rule. Chiang Mai fell to the Siamese on 15 January 1775.

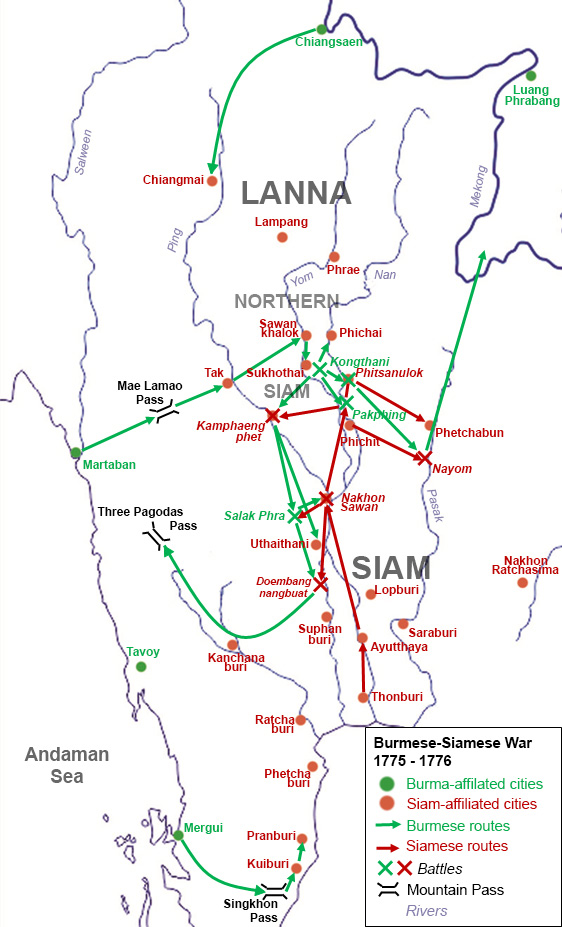
Burmese Invasion of Siam in 1775–1776 under Burmese general Maha Thiha Thura; the Burmese invaded Siam in three directions.

Burmese success in the war was boosted by the entry of Maha Thiha Thura – the renowned commander from Sino-Burmese War. In early 1775, Maha Thiha Thura sent his vanguard under Satpagyon Bo, one of the conquerors of Ayutthaya, to attack Western Siam through Three Pagodas Pass, leading to the Battle of Bangkaeo. Taksin managed to surround Satpagyon Bo and his Burmese forces for more than a month, forcing Satpagyon Bo to capitulate. In late 1775, Maha Thiha Thura himself marched his Burmese armies of 35,000 men to invade Northern Siam, laying siege on Phitsanulok. According to Thai chronicles, Siamese defenders suffered from effective firing of Burmese musketeers. In March 1776, Maha Thiha Thura broke Siamese defense line, repelled King Taksin and royal armies to the south and sacked Phitsanulok, burning and destroying the city. The Siamese then fell back to take defensive position at Thonburi. However, news of the death of Burmese king Hsinbyushin reached the front in June 1776. Maha Thiha Thura and his Burmese contingents were obliged to withdraw. Siam was thus saved from another possible Burmese conquest.

=== Ayutthaya after 1767 ===
Before the Fall of Ayutthaya, the population of Ayutthaya city is estimated to be as high as one million people around 1700 AD, likely an exaggerated number. When Phraya Tak, subsequently King Taksin, reconquered Ayutthaya in November 1767, he found the former Siamese royal capital in total ruins, filled with decaying human skeletons in aftermath of the war. With prospective Burmese retaliation still looming, Taksin needed a defensible stronghold against possible Burmese attacks and the ruinous city of Ayutthaya could not serve that purpose. In strategic move, Taksin ordered migration of remaining Ayutthayan citizens down south to Thonburi – his new base only twenty kilometers from the Gulf of Siam. In December 1767, Taksin crowned himself as the new King of Siam and established Thonburi as the new Siamese royal seat, ending centuries of Ayutthaya being Siamese royal capital.

The destruction of Ayutthaya continued after 1767. During the Fall of Ayutthaya, Ayutthayan elites hastily buried their wealth and treasures in the city grounds in order to prevent them from being looted by Burmese conquerors and for possible future retrieve. However, not all Ayutthayan elites returned to reclaim their wealth as majority of them were either dead or deported to Burma. In the Thonburi Period, Ayutthaya became a haven for treasure diggers. Treasure hunting business in Ayutthaya became so lucrative that the Thonburi court had to grant concession for entrepreneurs to loot the ruins. Johann Gerhard König, a Danish botanist, visited Ayutthaya in December 1778, eleven years after the fall;

The number of the temples in the town must have been very great, and they now offer a terrible spectacle, because so many of the vaulted roofs and high columns are all overgrown with trees and shrubs, so densely intermixed with climbing plants that there is a general belief that the town was filled with tigers.

Treasure hunting in the former Siamese capital had continued up until infamously, in 1956, when treasure robbers broke into the then undiscovered crypt of Wat Ratchaburana; the story became a national headline sensation.

In 1781, King Taksin granted tax monopoly in Ayutthaya to an official named Phra Wichitnarong, who forcibly extorted tax from treasure hunters, enraging Ayutthayan populace and leading to a violent rebellion in Ayutthaya in 1782 led by Bunnak Banmaela. King Taksin sent Phraya San to put down rebellion in Ayutthaya but Phraya San instead returned to seize power in Thonburi. In subsequent chain of events, King Taksin was executed and Chaophraya Chakri ascended the throne as King Rama I of the Chakri dynasty in 1782. Bricks were in urgent need for construction of the new royal capital of Bangkok and Ayutthaya ruins were the great source of building materials. Ayutthaya ruins were dismantled for bricks for construction of Bangkok in 1782. King Rama I appointed Bunnak Banmaela as Phraya Chaiwichit the governor of Ayutthaya. In Rattanakosin Period, governors of Ayutthaya were known by the title Phraya Chaiwichit. Ayutthaya survived as a provincial city. Jean-Baptiste Pallegoix visited Ayutthaya in 1834, noting that new Ayutthaya city had a population of about 40,000 people surrounding the ruins inhabited by Siamese, Chinese and Lao people. Also, Pallegoix observed that the treasure looting in Ayutthaya was still in practice, even it had been seven decades after the fall of Ayutthaya.

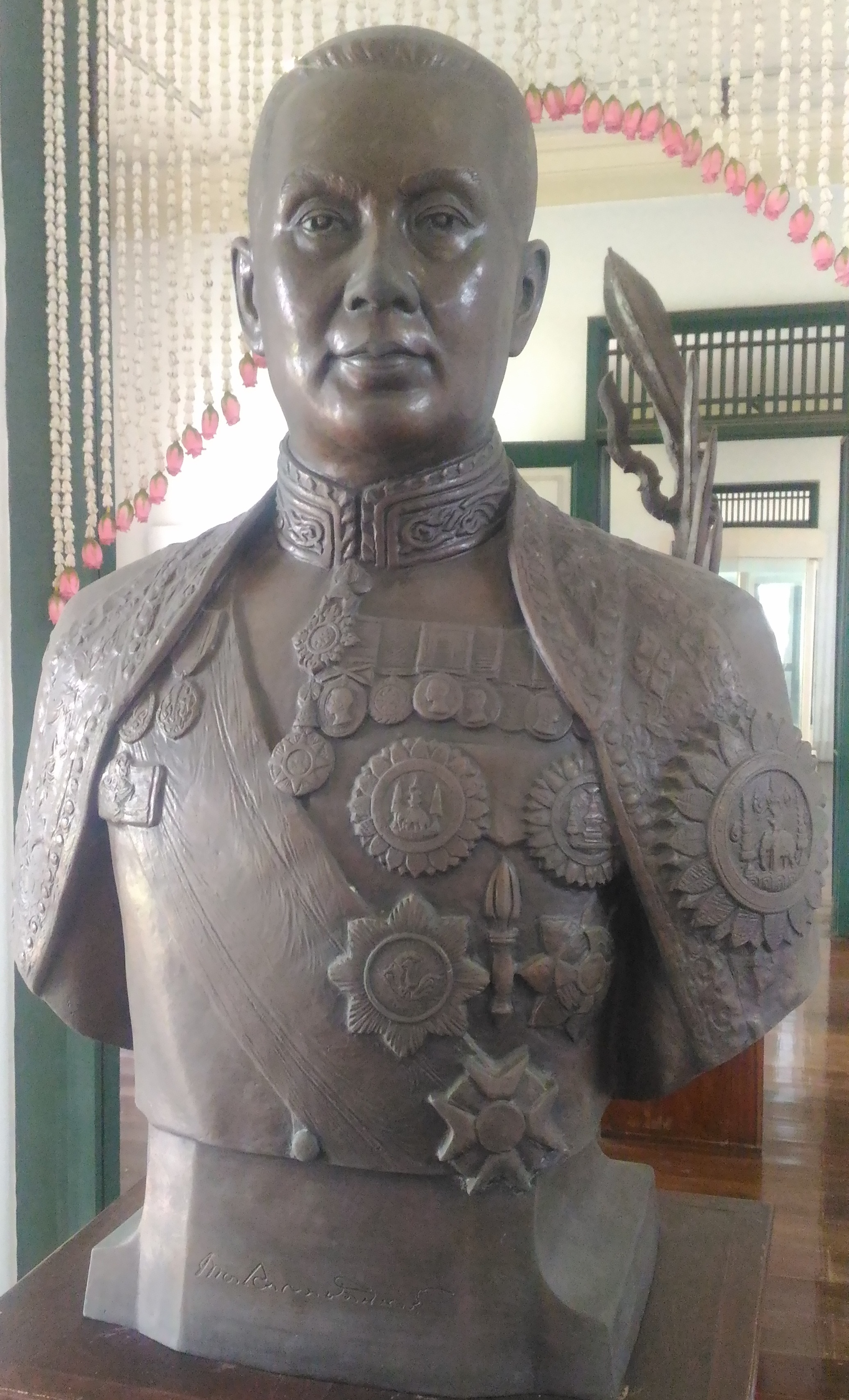
Bust of Phraya Boran Ratchathanin (1872–1936), governor of Ayutthaya, pioneer of archeological surveys and excavations of Ayutthaya.

In late nineteenth century, Siamese royal court at Bangkok began to take interests in historical studies of Ayutthaya. First native map of post-1767 Ayutthaya was produced around 1850. King Chulalongkorn and his minister Prince Damrong took interest in recovering the history of Ayutthaya as a part of modernized nation-building. Phraya Boran Ratchathanin (Thai: พระยาโบราณราชธานินทร์) was appointed as governor of Ayutthaya in 1898, becoming the pioneer of archeological surveys and excavations of Ayutthaya. Boran Ratchathanin led the first excavation of the ruins of Ayutthaya in 1907, describing the state of Ayutthayan royal palace ruins as "mounds of broken bricks, and shards of plaster, overgrown with trees". It was required to dig for about 1.5 meters through the rubbles and deposited silt layers to get to the foundation base of Ayutthaya ruins. Boran Ratchathanin cleared the site and identified buildings. In 1929, Phraya Boran Ratchathanin published the first modern detailed archeological map of Ayutthaya. Modern Thai Department of Fine Arts initiated new rounds of excavation in 1969 as Ayutthaya was declared national historical park in 1976. Ayutthaya Historical Park was eventually listed as UNESCO World heritage site in 1991.

== Contemporary impact ==
=== Impact on geopolitics ===
Perhaps the most important legacy of the war was the reemergence of Siam as a major military power in mainland Southeast Asia. The war replaced the ancien régime of Ayutthaya and brought in a new energetic dynasty. Despite the Burmese kingdom remaining a periodical threat to Siam's survival for several more decades, the new Siamese leadership rallied the kingdom and challenged the Burmese over new and untested territories, redressing Siam's "historical military inferiority to Burma". A resurgent Siam assembled a defensive empire by swallowing Burmese vassals/tributaries in Lan Na, the Lao states, and parts of the Shan States by the turn of the 19th century.

Despite Siam temporary recapturing portions of Tenasserim in the decades following 1767, Siam would never successfully keep the Tenasserim Coast ever again.

By the early 19th century, Siam, under the Rattanakosin dynasty, was one of three main powers in mainland Southeast Asia, along with Burma and Vietnam, and had the second largest empire in all of Southeast Asia after the Konbaung dynasty. After the First Anglo-Burmese War of 1824–1826 removed the Burmese threat to Siam, the Siamese empire expanded eastwards, vassalizing a new ring of minor kingdoms up to the Vietnamese border and acquiring manpower from farfetched outlying regions to replenish the depleted Siamese population until the onset of British and French colonialism in Mainland Southeast Asia in the late 19th and early 20th centuries.

=== Depopulation of Siam ===
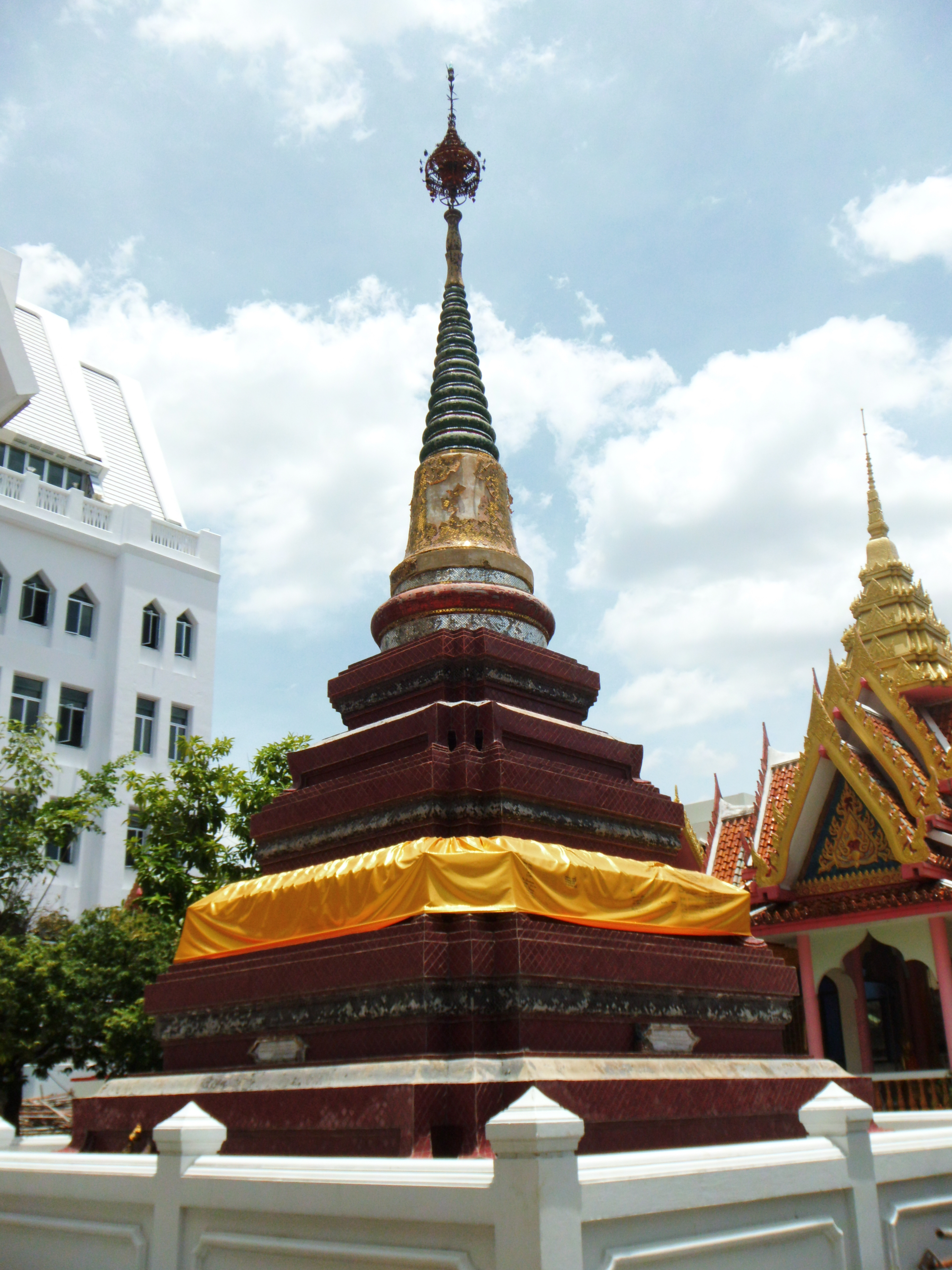
In 1792, a Burmese governor of Tavoy sought refuge in Yan Nawa, bringing with him Burmese-Tavoy immigrants. Wat Don Thawai temple (pictured) was constructed in 1797 to be the center of Burmese community in Bangkok.

The population of Siam in the decades prior to the fall of Ayutthaya in 1767 was estimated to be around two million people with around 200,000 people in the city of Ayutthaya itself. No direct records exist about Siamese demographic change after 1767 but it is estimated that around 200,000 Siamese people died during the war and it is recorded that 100,000 Siamese people (according to Burmese chronicles) or 30,000 people (figure according to Thai sources) were deported to Burma. The resulting depopulation of Siam influenced Siamese geopolitical policies in subsequent Thonburi and Rattanakosin Periods. Central Thailand was the most affected region due to being the focus of the war. Large number of Siamese people also fled into the jungles in escape from universal chaos and brutality. In later periods, per the custom of traditional Southeast Asian warfare, Siam waged wars against neighboring kingdoms and seized a large number of war captives to relieve Siam's own manpower shortages. Major population influx events included;

- 1773; After occupying Cambodia for two years, Siamese forces retreated from Cambodia in 1773, deporting 10,000 Cambodian people to settle in Western Siam.
- 1779; In the aftermath of Siamese conquest of Lao kingdom of Vientiane, more than 100,000 Lao people were deported from Vientiane to settle in various cities in Central Thailand including Thonburi, Saraburi and Ratchaburi.
- 1786; Siamese conquest of Pattani; Pattani Malays were deported to settle in northeastern outskirts of Bangkok.
- 1804; Around 5,000 Northern Thai people from the fallen Burmese-occupied city of Chiang Saen were deported to settle in Saraburi and Ratchaburi.
- 1828; Anouvong's Rebellion; 100,000 to 300,000 Lao people were deported from Laos to settle in many cities of Central Thailand including Bangkok, Ratchaburi, Prachinburi and Nakhon Ratchasima.
- 1834; Siamese–Vietnamese War; Vietnamese Christians and Cambodian Christians from Cochinchina immigrated to settle in Bangkok.

King Taksin also promoted immigration of Chinese people to Siam. Population of Siam rose from around two million people in late eighteenth century to four million people in mid-nineteenth century. It took nearly a century, after series of forced and voluntary immigrations, to satisfy Siam's need for manpower.

=== Impact on Siamese economy ===
Before the fall of Ayutthaya, since the early eighteenth century, Siam had been a major rice producer and rice exporter to Qing China – Siam's main trading partner. Agricultural production virtually ceased during the three-year war as population decline and destruction of plantations led to dramatic decrease of rice resource. In Thonburi period, King Taksin faced post-apocalyptic situation of food shortage, starvation and inflation as major challenge. Surviving people from war died from starvation. Taksin simply distributed money to desolate people in need. Domestic rice commodity price rose to high level as rice production stopped, reaching five times higher price than that of before the fall of Ayutthaya. Siam resorted to become a rice importer as Siamese government bought cheaper rice from overseas to relieve famine, notably from the port city-state of Hà Tiên. In 1776, King Taksin had to commission his ministers to personally oversee rice production in Thonburi outskirts to ensure adequate yield.

The Ayutthaya royal court had gained revenue from trading with China and the Dutch. The new king Taksin sought to renew relations with these foreign powers in order to generate income for his government. The Dutch outright refused to renew trade relations with Siam in 1769, leaving China as the only alternative. Taksin then sought recognition from Chinese imperial court in order to enter trade-tributary relations with the Qing dynasty. Through recovering rice production and trade with China, Siamese economy gradually recuperated. By early nineteenth century, in early Rattanakosin Period, Siam again became a rice exporter and economic conditions was restored as what had been in Ayutthaya times.

=== Siamese influence on Burmese culture ===
The Siamese captives carried off from Ayutthaya went on to have an outsize influence on traditional Burmese theatre and dance. In 1789, a Burmese royal commission consisting of Princes and Ministers was charged with translating Siamese and Javanese dramas from Thai to Burmese. With the help of Siamese artists captured from Ayutthaya in 1767, the commission adapted two important epics from Thai to Burmese: the Siamese Ramayana and the Enao, the Siamese version of Javanese Panji tales into Burmese Yama Zattaw and Enaung Zattaw. One style of classical Burmese dance, Yodaya Aka (lit. Ayutthayan dance) is considered one of the most delicate of all traditional Burmese dances. Yodaya songs also form a genre of the Mahāgīta, the Burmese canon of classical songs.

== Legacy and historiography ==
=== Creation of Siamese/Thai proto-nationalism ===
Prior to the destruction of the Siamese state in 1767, Siamese monarchs rarely used the idea of the king being the "defender of religion, people [sic], and god." However, after 1767, the Thonburi and Bangkok dynasties took and wholeheartedly promoted elite proto-nationalism in order to defend Siamese Buddhism and Siamese Kingdom in times of future existential threats similar to 1767. The next subsequent Siamese monarchs Taksin, Rama I, and Rama II all emphasized the idea of proto-nationalism by emphasizing the ambition to protect the kingdom and Buddhism, issuing strict capital punishments for phrai who refused to fight to defend the "Lord Buddha", and creating maps of Burmese invasion routes and translating Burmese chronicles into Thai. This form of proto-nationalism would play a significant role in transforming a proto-national, royalist, narrative into a national narrative by Westernizing monarchs Rama V, Rama VI, and Rama VII, and by the post-1932 Khana Ratsadon (People's Party) government in successfully fabricating a Siamese, later Thai, national identity in response to 19th-century European colonialism.

In comparison to Burma, in the First Anglo-Burmese War of 1824–26, sixty years after the fall of Ayutthaya, the historian Michael Woundy wrote that, "The Burmese may have stood a chance had they sensed that the British posed a threat to the very existence of their nation."

=== Impact on Thai-Burmese relations ===
The legacy of the war has lingered on negatively on the Burmese–Thai relations ever since.

==== Thai views ====
The fall of Ayutthaya is considered one of Thailand's greatest national calamities. A Siamese chronicler wrote: "The king of Hanthawaddy (Bayinnaung) waged war like a monarch but the king of Ava (Hsinbyushin) like a robber." In 1917, Siamese prince Damrong Rajanubhab published a highly nationalist history of the centuries long hostility between the two countries, Our Wars with the Burmese (Thai Rop Pharma), which had a major influence on the development of Thailand's view of its national history, as found in school text books and popular culture. In his view, not only were the Burmese a savage and aggressive people but Siam was defeated in war only when it was unprepared and divided against itself. Kings who rallied the people, such as Naresuan and Rama I, waged successful wars of national liberation against an imperialist enemy. Thus ancient battles between rival rulers suddenly became wars between nations.

More recent scholarship has cautioned against casting the history of the 16th and 18th centuries in a 20th-century conceptual framework. Historian Donald Seekins writes that "the 24 Thai–Burmese wars described by Damrong were wars between Monarchs rather than between nations", and that "many prominent Siamese of the era, including Naresuan's father, were willing to accept Burmese overlordship". Another historian Helen James writes that "these wars were primarily struggles for regional and dynastic supremacy and were neither national nor ethnic conflicts." After all, many Siamese levies participated in the attack on Ayutthaya. This view is echoed by modern Thai academics such as Nidhi Eoseewong and Sunait Chutintaranond. According to Sunait "The negative attitude toward the Burmese does not occur solely as a result of the past relationship. It is, rather, the outcome of political manoeuvres by the Thai nationalist governments, especially military regimes."

Nonetheless, the modern academic viewpoints have not replaced Damrong's viewpoints in Thai schoolbooks, or popular culture. This has fostered a feeling of enmity among the Thai people towards the Burmese, and has colored the Thai-Burmese relations to the present day with real political ramifications. This enmity at least in the Thai political leadership manifested in the Thai "buffer zone" policy, which has provided shelter, at various times and has actively encouraged and "sponsored", the several ethnic resistance groups along the border.

==== Burmese views ====
In December 1954, U Nu, the first prime minister of the Union of Burma, on his first state visit to Bangkok, publicly apologized for Burma's past misdeeds. However, most Burmese today only know superficially about their past kings' invasions. Most know little about the destruction and atrocities committed by the Burmese troops in Siam because Burmese school books simply do not mention them. Many Burmese fail to realize some of the historical reasons behind the Thai enmity, and the Thai governments' buffer zone policy. Many Burmese, especially those in the military, remain skeptical of the Thai governments' assurances that it would not tolerate any activities that "undermine stability of neighboring countries".

== In popular culture ==
- The 2018 Thai soap opera Nueng Dao Fa Diao and Sai Lohit depicts the Burmese–Siamese War (1765–1767).

== See also ==
- Burmese–Siamese wars
- Burma–Thailand relations
- Siege of Ayutthaya (1767)
- Sino-Burmese War (1765–1769)
