= Kyaukton =

- Village
- Location in Burma
- Coordinates: 14°9′30″N 98°43′26″E
- Country: Burma
- Region: Taninthayi Region
- District: Dawei District
- Township: Dawei Township
- Subtownship: Myitta Subtownship
- Elevation: 170 m (570 ft)
- Time zone: UTC+6.30 (MST)

Kyaukton, is a village of Dawei District in the Taninthayi Division of Myanmar. It is located on the western side of the Tenasserim Range, 24 km to the northwest of Sinbyudaing.

== Geography ==
Kyaukton lies east of a bend in the Great Tenasserim River, not far from the border with Thailand. Thiwe Taung mountain is located near the village.

The road, now being developed, between Dawei (Tavoy) and Bangkok passes just north of the town to the northwest. Also a railway line is planned.
