= Dawei (disambiguation) =

Dawei is a city in Myanmar.

Dawei may also refer to:

== Places ==
- Dawei Township, the political division containing the city
- Dawei District, the political division containing the township
- Dawei Airport, the airport serving the city of Dawei
- Dawei River, the river passing through the city of Dawei

== People ==
- Li Dawei (writer), Chinese author
- Li Dawei (director), Chinese film and television director
- Tong Dawei, Chinese actor
- Wu Dawei, Vice Foreign Minister of the People's Republic of China
- Liu Wei (born 1987), Chinese video game producer and president of miHoYo, often referred to by gamers as "Da Wei"

== Other ==
- Dawei people, the native inhabitants of this region
- Tavoyan language, either a dialect of Burmese or a separate language of the same language family
- David (name), of which Dawei is the Chinese transcription
