= Sinbyudaing =

Sinbyudaing ဆင်ဖြူတိုင်
- Town
- Location in Burma
- Coordinates: 14°2′N 98°53′E
- Country: Burma
- Region: Taninthayi Region
- District: Dawei District
- Township: Dawei Township
- Subtownship: Myitta Subtownship
- Elevation: 150 m (490 ft)
- Time zone: UTC+6.30 (MST)

Sinbyudaing (Burmese: ဆင်ဖြူတိုင်; Thai: สิ่นผิ่วโด่ง; also spelt Hsinbyudaing or Sin Byu Daing), is a small village of Dawei District in the Taninthayi Region of Myanmar. It is located on the western side of the Tenasserim Range near the border with Thailand.

== Infrastructure ==
Currently a road is being built to Dawei (Tavoy) from Bangkok that will improve communication with Myitta town to the northwest and the currently developed Htee Khee–Phu Nam Ron border pass to the southeast. Also a railway line is planned.

== History ==
During the Japanese conquest of Burma, the forces of the Imperial Japanese Army began their invasion crossing the Tenasserim Hills through from Thailand reaching Sinbyudaing on 15 January 1942 and moving westwards to attack Myitta town. The three 6th Burma Rifles companies of the Tavoy garrison posted there were overrun by the Japanese troops.
