= Tourism in Myanmar =

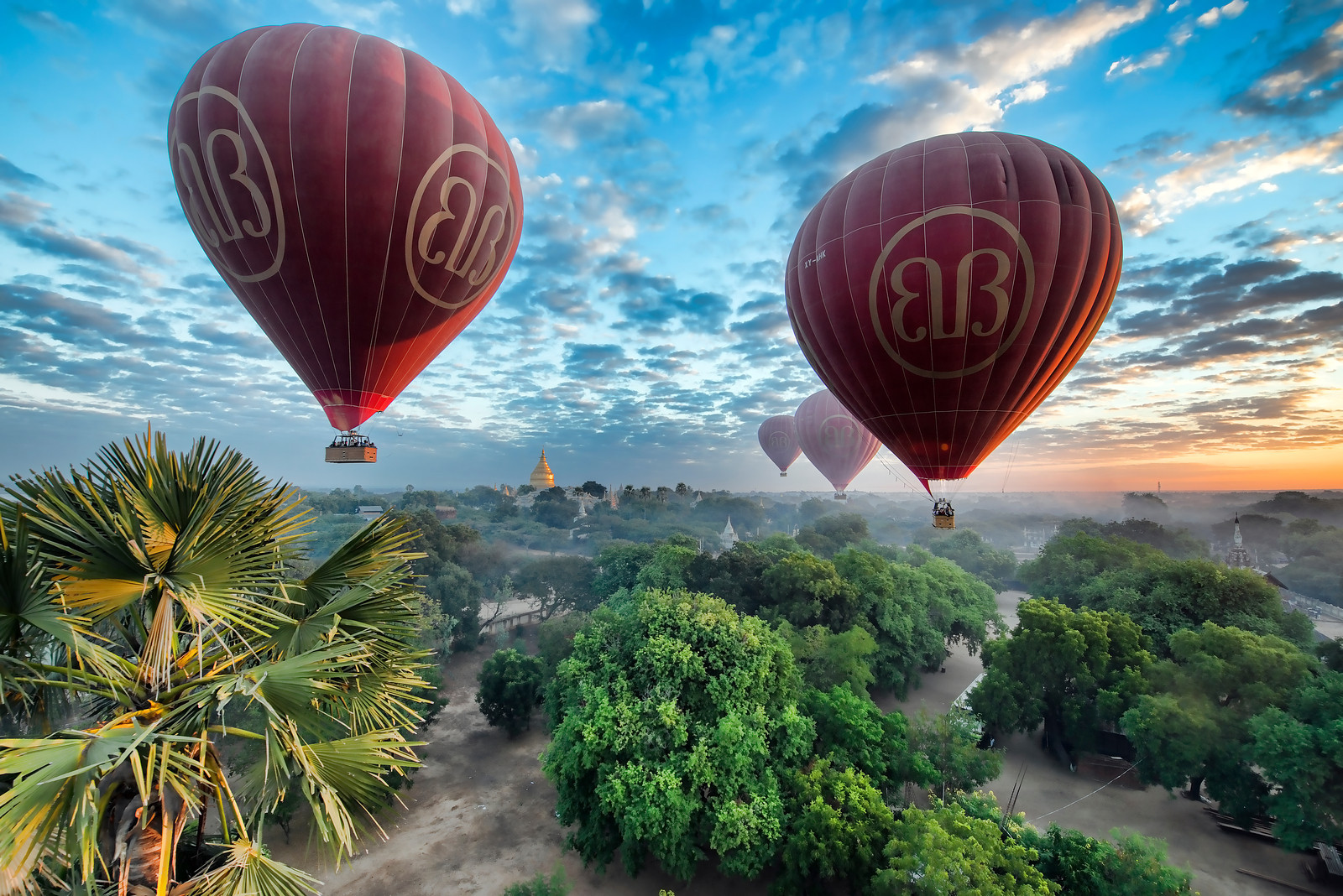
Balloon rides are a popular way for tourists to see the pagodas of Bagan.

Tourism in Myanmar (formerly known as Burma) is a developing sector. As of 2023, new tourist visa applications have resumed. Although Myanmar possesses tourist potential, much of the industry remains to be developed. The number of visitors to Burma is small compared to its neighbouring countries. This is primarily due to its political situation. However, after the junta transferred power to the civilian government, the tourism sector saw an increase in tourist arrivals, and in 2012, tourist arrivals surpassed the one million mark for the first time. In 2013, the Tourism Master Plan was created, targeting 7.5 million arrivals by 2020.

Tourism has been developed mainly by Myanmar's government, which has encouraged tourism since 1992. Private enterprises also exist, catering to a wide range of tourists.

In 2010, 791,505 foreign tourists visited Myanmar, with 295,174 foreign tourists entering the country via Yangon International Airport. By 2012, more than 1 million foreign tourists visited Myanmar. In 2013, the number of foreign arrivals reached more than 2.04 million, counting both air and overland arrivals.

Tourism has been promoted by advocacy groups as a method of providing economic benefit to Burmese civilians, and to avoid isolating the country from the rest of the world. Voices for Burma, a pro-democracy advocate group, states, "We believe that small-scale, responsible tourism can create more benefits than harm. So long as tourists are fully aware of the situation and take steps to maximise their positive impact and minimise the negatives, we feel their visit can be beneficial overall. Responsible tourists can help Burma primarily by bringing money to local communities and small businesses, and by raising awareness of the situation worldwide."

A former Burmese tourism minister estimated that 12% of the government revenues are derived from tourism, with the tourism industry contributing US$182 million (2007) to the government's annual budget.

In March 2020, Myanmar closed its borders to international tourists as a measure to prevent the spread of the COVID-19 pandemic. Furthermore, following the 2021 coup, the country became increasingly isolated. Large-scale protests and escalating acts of violence have inflicted significant damage upon Myanmar's economy, including the tourism sector, which has been pushed into a state of decline.

The country reopened to international flights on April 17, 2022, given the decrease in infection cases and the reopening of neighboring countries. In a statement issued by the committee, the decision to reopen aims to boost the tourism sector and provide favorable conditions for visitors to come and explore Myanmar.

== Statistics ==
In the 2010–2011 fiscal year, tourists comprised 73.84% (313,127 arrivals) of overseas visitors, primarily entering the country by air, representing 69.26% of arrivals, followed by land and sea, which represented 29.97% and 0.77% of arrivals respectively. An additional 110,914 visitors arrived through other visa types and represented an additional 26.16% of the total. In 2012, revenues from tourism jumped to over $534 million in 2012, up from $315 million in 2011.

Recent data reveals that in 2016, Myanmar welcomed only 2.9 million tourists, marking a 38% decrease compared to the previous year (4.7 million visitors in 2015). According to Rogers, the rosy projections about tourism potential led to significant investments in hotel construction. Data from the Ministry of Hotels and Tourism indicates that within a span of five years (up until 2015), 1,300 hotels were built in Myanmar, with foreign businesses collectively investing $2.7 billion in hotel ventures.

=== General trends ===
International tourist arrivals to Yangon Entry Point, Mandalay & Bagan Gateways, Nay Pyi Taw Gateway and Border Tourism.

Year	Tourist arrivals	% Change
2024	1,063,072	▼17%
2023	1,284,731	▲450%
2022	233,487	▲78%
2021	130,947	▼86%
2020	903,343	▼79%
2019	4,364,101	▲23%
2018	3,551,428	▲3%
2017	3,443,133	▲18%
2016	2,907,207	▼38%
2015	4,681,020	▲52%
2014	3,081,412	▲51%
2013	2,044,307	▲93%
2012	1,058,995	▲30%
2011	816,369	▲3%
2010	791,505	▲4%
2009	762,547	▲4%
2008	731,230	▲2%

=== Tourists by nationality ===
The governmental statistics body, the Central Statistical Organization, reported more than 3,000,000 travellers flocked to Myanmar in 2014, compared with approximately 816,000 visitors in 2011. Among these, 1,022,081 tourist arrivals (excluding visitors under special entry visas such as social or business visas) were via Yangon International Airport.

Most visitors arriving to Myanmar on short-term basis were from the following countries of nationality:

Country	2024	2022	2021	2020	2019	2018	2017	2016	2015	2014	2013	2012	2011
China	99,852	22,798	110,468	8.241	749,719	333,085	212,642	183,886	147,977	125,609	90,550	70,805	62,018
Thailand	42,105	13,192	58,931	1,150	273,157	291,231	273,889	243,443	204,539	198,229	139,770	94,342	61,696
Japan	19,355	6,605	26,100	1,171	125,706	104,376	101,484	100,084	90,312	83,434	68,671	47,690	21,321
South Korea	23,213	6,854	19,363	1,080	111,794	72,852	65,829	64,397	63,715	58,472	54,934	34,805	22,524
United States	9,377	3,052	15,030	614	66,757	65,057	73,085	76,502	69,015	62,631	53,653	37,589	21,680
Singapore	7,381	3,292	8,762	217	57,890	58,657	61,859	50,198	45,125	47,692	39,140	26,296	15,391
Vietnam	9,385	3,669	9,825	182	52,567	53,329	58,919	48,869	—N/a	—N/a	—N/a	—N/a	—N/a
Malaysia	6,135	3,892	8.497	981	44,703	47,632	47,010	43,931	40,852	46,534	39,758	30,499	23,287
India	15,334	8,069	11,514	1,454	48,400	43,281	41,623	38,537	34,638	32,306	21,042	16,868	12,318
France	1,965	898	15,520	360	42,508	43,218	58,369	52,304	47,235	41,453	35,462	30,064	19,414
United Kingdom	4,019	1,575	9,317	300	33,857	36,609	47,717	51,051	45,120	40,921	33,203	24,296	11,056
Germany	1,266	549	9,052	83	29,447	28,838	39,952	39,044	35,727	32,265	27,712	23,063	14,006
Russia	3,893												
Australia	2,549	1,078	5,952	195	25,867	27,962	32,628	34,010	30,820	29,175	11,728	18,261	10,415
Italy	878	401	5,794	77	19,121	16,855	18,242	17,969	14,821	12,613	11,728	10,830	9,710
Philippines	3,141	1,145	3,311	233	17,398	16,748	18,143	16,421	—N/a	—N/a	—N/a	—N/a	—N/a
Spain	776	228	2,182	52	13,589	11,315	13,558	12,765	—N/a	—N/a	—N/a	—N/a	—N/a
Canada	1,206	437	2,735	77	11,050	11,065	14,068	15,024	14,051	12,268	8,975	6,485	3,685
Switzerland	582	323	2,877	93	9,257	10,019	13,558	13,694	13,897	—N/a	—N/a	—N/a	—N/a
Netherlands	1,002	437	2,648	77	9,500	9,428	13,950	—N/a	—N/a	—N/a	—N/a	—N/a	—N/a
Hong Kong	1,766	347	4,393	42	32,005	7,183	—N/a	—N/a	—N/a	—N/a	—N/a	—N/a	—N/a
Taiwan	8,445	3,427	7,306	186	39,374	35,685	—N/a	—N/a	—N/a	—N/a	—N/a	—N/a	—N/a
Belgium	303												
Austria	145												
New Zealand	465												

== Tourist attractions ==
The most popular available tourist destinations in Myanmar include big cities such as Yangon and Mandalay; religious sites in Mon State, Pindaya, Bago and Hpa-An; nature trails in Inle Lake, Kalaw, Kengtung, Putao, Pyin Oo Lwin, also known as Maymyo; ancient cities such as Bagan and Mrauk-U; as well as beaches in Nabule, Ngapali, Maungmagan Ngwe-Saung, Mergui.

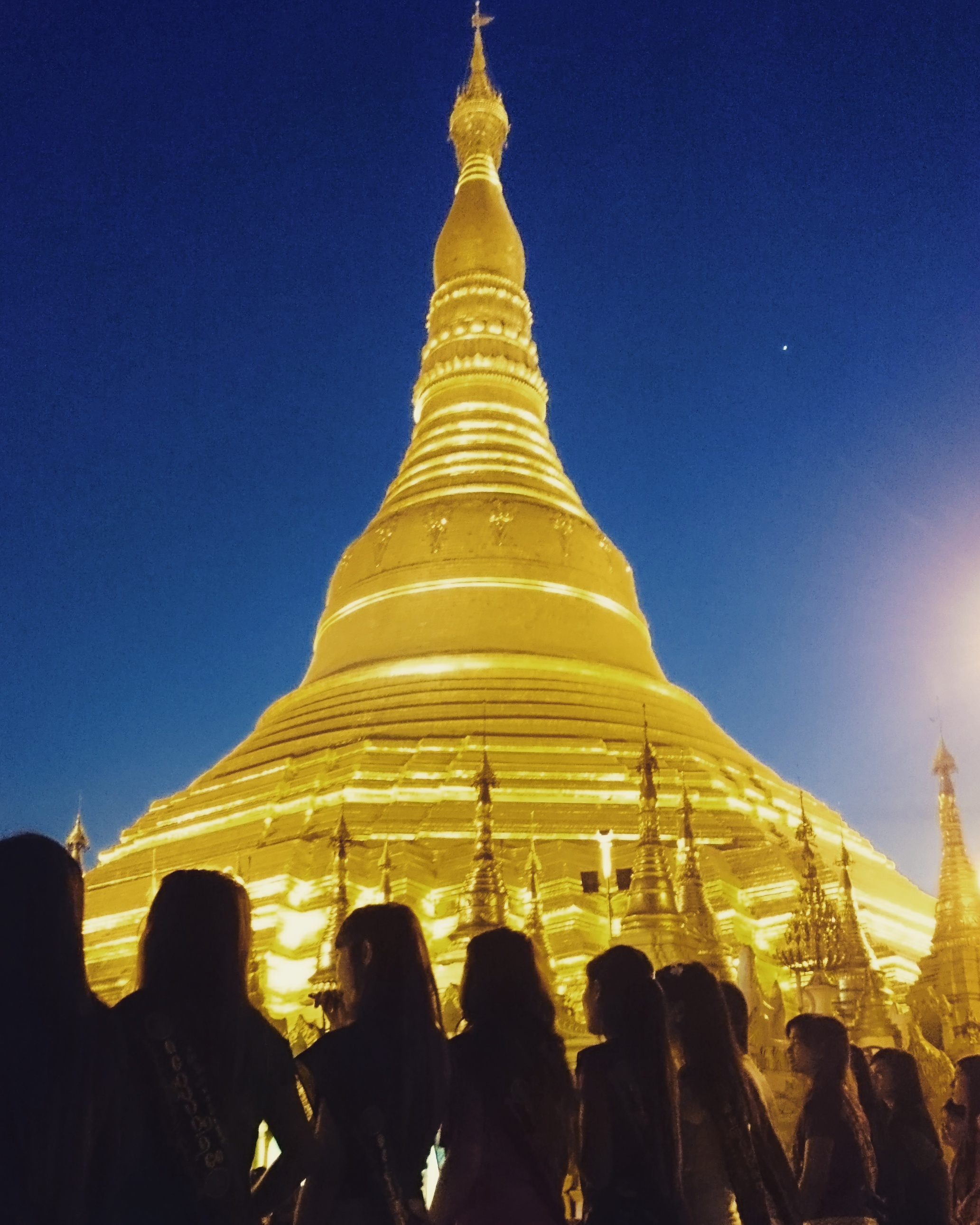
Shwedagon Pagoda at dusk

=== Kachin State ===
- Myitkyina
- Putao
- Bamho
- Hugaung Plain

=== Yangon ===
- Yangon
- Shwedagon Pagoda

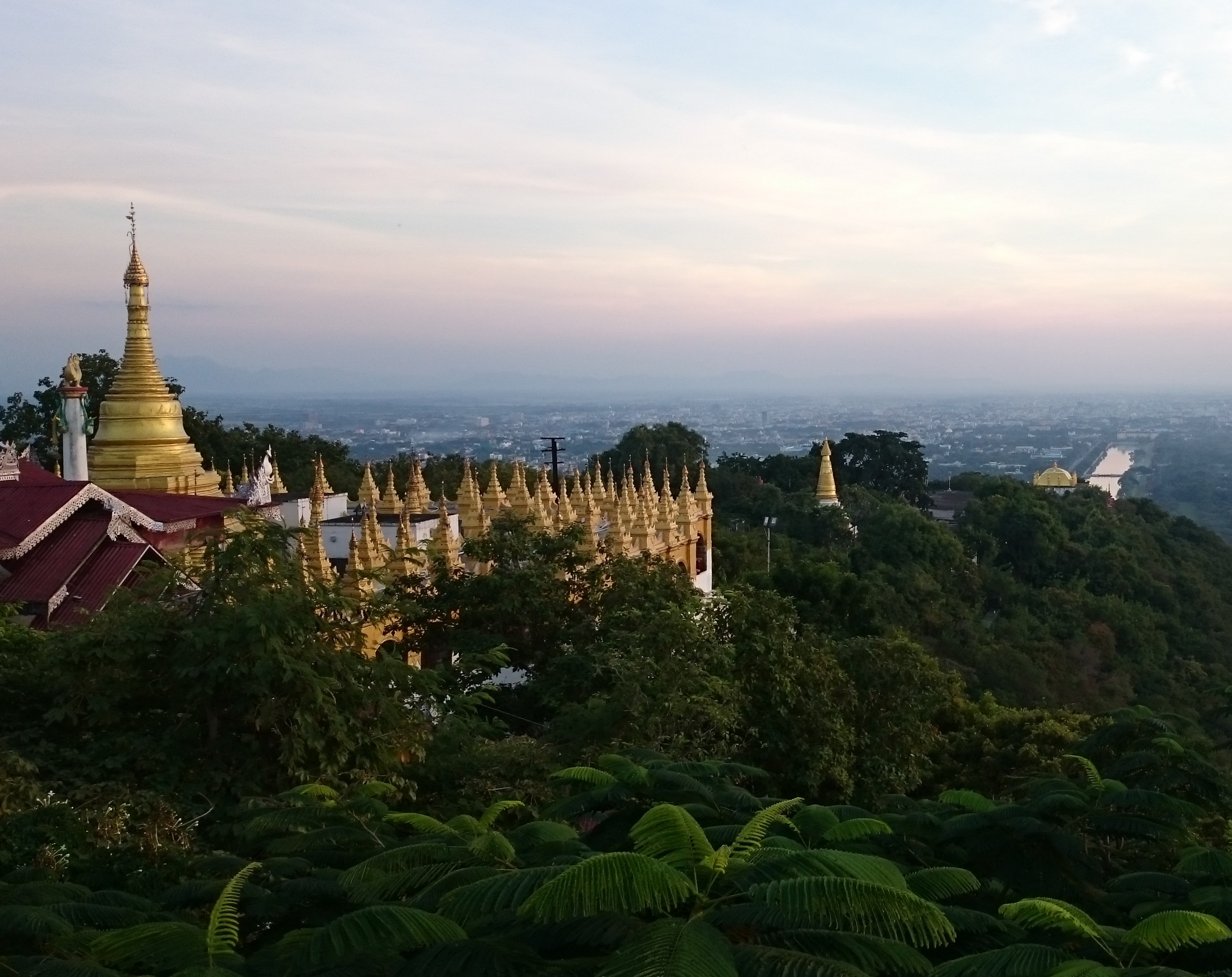
View from Mandalay Hill

=== Mandalay ===
- Mandalay
- Bagan
- Ava
- Amarapura
- Pyin U Lwin
- Mount Popa

=== Mon State ===
- Kyaiktiyo Pagoda
- Mudon (the world's largest reclining Buddha)
- Mawlamyine
- Thanbyuzayat (WWII Death Railway)

=== Rakhine State ===
- Mrauk U
- Ngapali Beach

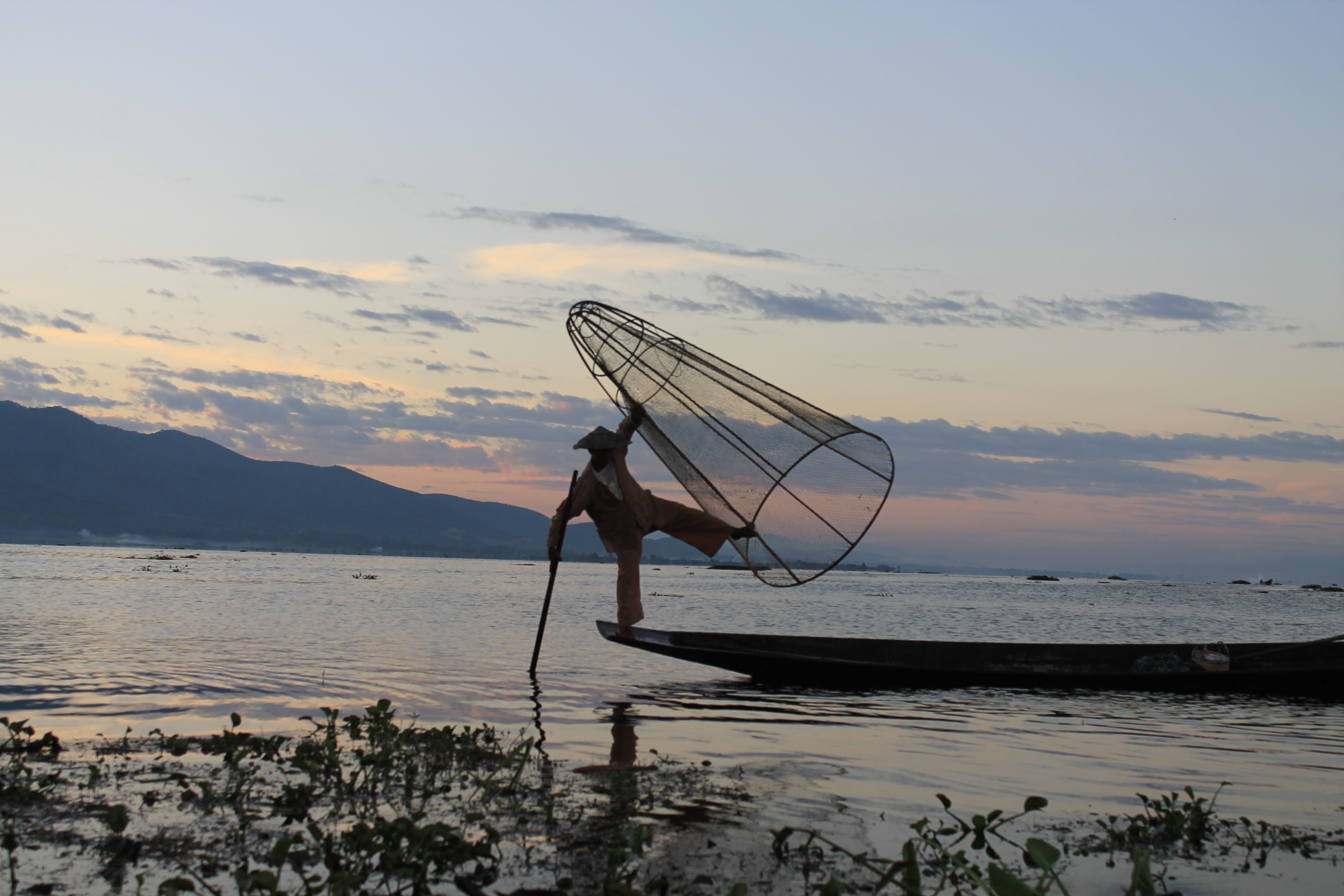
A fisherman on Inle Lake

=== Shan State ===
- Inle Lake
- Taunggyi
- Kalaw
- Pindaya

=== Other beaches ===
- Chaungtha
- Ngwesaung

=== Ecotourism ===
- Myeik Archipelago
- Hukawng Valley
- Hkakabo Razi
- Alaungdaw Kathapa National Park
- Popa Mountain National Park
- Mount Victoria National Park

== UNESCO World Heritage Sites in Myanmar ==
Site	Image	Location	Criteria	Area ha (acre)	Year	Description	Refs
Pyu city-states		Myanmar	Cultural: (ii), (iii), (iv)	5,809 ha (proper); 6,790 ha (buffer zone)	2014	The site includes three of the six main Pyu city-states, namely Halin, Beikthano and Sri Ksetra.	
Bagan		Mandalay Region	Cultural		2018	The site includes all of the monuments throughout the ancient capital of the Pagan kingdom.	

=== Tentative list to be added ===
Site	Image	Location	Proposed criteria	Year Listed as Tentative Site	Description	Refs
Wooden Monasteries of Konbaung Period: Ohn Don, Sala, Pakhangyi, Pakhannge, Legaing, Sagu, Shwe-Kyaung (Mandalay)		Multiple locations	Cultural	1996	The site includes seven wooden monasteries, nameyly, Ohn Don, Sala, Pakhangyi, Pakhannge, Legaing, Sagu, and Shwe-Kyaung (Mandalay).	
Badah-lin and associated caves		Shan State	Cultural	1996	The site includes various caves used as workshop and rock painting sites in the Paleolithic to Neolithic periods.	
Ancient cities of Upper Myanmar: Innwa, Amarapura, Sagaing, Mingun, Mandalay		Multiple locations	Cultural	1996	The site includes the historic cities of Innwa, Amarapura, Sagaing, Mingun, Mandalay	
Myauk-U Archaeological Area and Monuments		Rakhine State	Cultural	1996	The site includes all monuments built by the Arakanese kingdom's capital between the 15th to 16th centuries.	
Inle Lake		Shan State	Cultural	1996	The site includes the mountain lake and its preserved cultural landscape.	
Mon cities: Bago, Hanthawaddy		Bago Region	Cultural	1996	The site includes all monuments in Bago, formerly called Hanthawaddy.	
Ayeyawady River Corridor		Multiple locations	Natural	2014	The site includes three main segments, namely Mingun to Kyauk Maung segment, Moda Section, Takaung to Shwegu segment, and Shwegu to Bhamo segment.	
Hkakabo Razi Landscape		Kachin State	Natural	2014	The site includes Hkakabo Razi National Park and Hponkan Razi Wildlife Sanctuary, along with a proposed Southern Extension of Hkakabo Razi National Park.	
Indawgyi Lake Wildlife Sanctuary		Kachin State	Natural	2014	The site includes the entire Indawgyi lake.	
Natma Taung National Park		Chin State	Natural	2014	The site includes Nat Ma Taung, the highest point in Chin State.	
Myeik Archipelago		Tanintharyi Region	Natural	2014	The site includes more than 800 islands of primarily limestone and granite. The archipelago is home to the Moken people.	
Hukaung Valley Wildlife Sanctuary		Kachin State	Natural	2014	The site is highly significant in the conservation of Indochinese tigers.	
Taninthayi Forest Corridor		Taninthayi Region	Natural	2014	The site is an important mixed deciduous forest with bamboo clumps as well as grassland and is a thriving site for the endangered Gurney's pitta.	

== History & Politics ==
Under British rule, Burma (as it was then called) attracted few foreign tourists. This situation persisted post-independence. After the 1962 Burmese coup d'état, Ne Win restricted tourist visas to 24 hours to minimise the numbers of foreigners entering the country. This was extended to 72 hours in 1969, 7 days in 1971 and, after the 8888 uprising, to 14 days. This was further extended to 4 weeks in 1992, although the government, by now calling itself the SLORC, still feared the impact tourists could have on their repressive regime.

In 1996, during Visit Myanmar Year, Aung San Suu Kyi called for a boycott of travelling to Myanmar in an attempt to limit the money received by the ruling military junta.

In May 2011, Aung San Suu Kyi and her party National League for Democracy expressed the opinion that responsible tourism to Burma should be encouraged. Other pro-democracy activists, such as Ma Thanegi, advocated small scale tourism, and careful spending. Tourists are welcome to Burma provided they are "keen to promote the welfare of the common people and the conservation of the environment and to acquire an insight into the cultural, political and social life of the country while enjoying a happy and fulfilling holiday in Burma." In their official statement they request not only the development of the people's livelihood but also the promotion of "self respect and self-reliance in the people."

== See also ==
- Visa policy of Myanmar
- List of museums in Myanmar
- Community Based Tourism in Myanmar
