= Htee Khee =

Thai border town in Myanmar

Htihki ထိးခီး: Htee Khee; Htee Kee
- Location in Myanmar
- Coordinates: 13°53′17″N 99°04′46″E
- Country: Myanmar
- Region: Tanintharyi Region
- District: Dawei District
- Township: Dawei Township
- Time zone: UTC+6.30 (MST)

Htikhi (Burmese: ထီးခီး; also spelt Htee Khee) is a town in Dawei Township, Tanintharyi Region, Myanmar. The town is home to Phu Nam Ron, one of 7 official border trade posts with Thailand. In 2022, total trade volume at the border post stood at US$2.563 billion, making it the busiest border post with Thailand. As of September 2019, the road from Myitta, the closest Burmese town, which is 101 kilometres (63 mi) away, remained unpaved. A roads project was initiated in 2019, to link Htikhi to the Dawei Special Economic Zone. Htee Khee was formerly the headquarters of the Karen National Union's 4th brigade until 2012. After 3 years of closure, Htee Khee reopened for trade on 5 July 2025 under KNU control.
