= Moscos Islands Wildlife Sanctuary =

Protected area in Myanmar

- IUCN category IV (habitat/species management area)
- Location within Myanmar
- Location: Yebyu and Launglon Townships, Tanintharyi Region Myanmar
- Coordinates: 14°04′30″N 97°50′15″E
- Area: 49.21 km^{2} (19.00 sq mi)
- Established: 1927
- Governing body: Forest Department

Moscos Islands Wildlife Sanctuary is a protected area in the Moscos Islands, Myanmar, covering 49.21 km^{2} (19.00 sq mi). It ranges in elevation from 0 to 355 m (0 to 1,165 ft) and encompasses mostly evergreen forest. It was established in 1927; access is only permitted to staff of the Forest Department.
