= Kameik =

- Village
- Location in Burma
- Coordinates: 14°18′N 98°28′E
- Country: Burma
- Region: Taninthayi Region
- District: Dawei District
- Township: Dawei Township
- Elevation: 230 m (770 ft)
- Time zone: UTC+6.30 (MST)

Kameik is a village of Dawei District in the Taninthayi Division of Myanmar.

== Geography ==
It is located near the Kamaungthwe River on the western side of the Tenasserim Range near the border with Thailand.
