= Maungmagan =

- Village
- Maungmagan
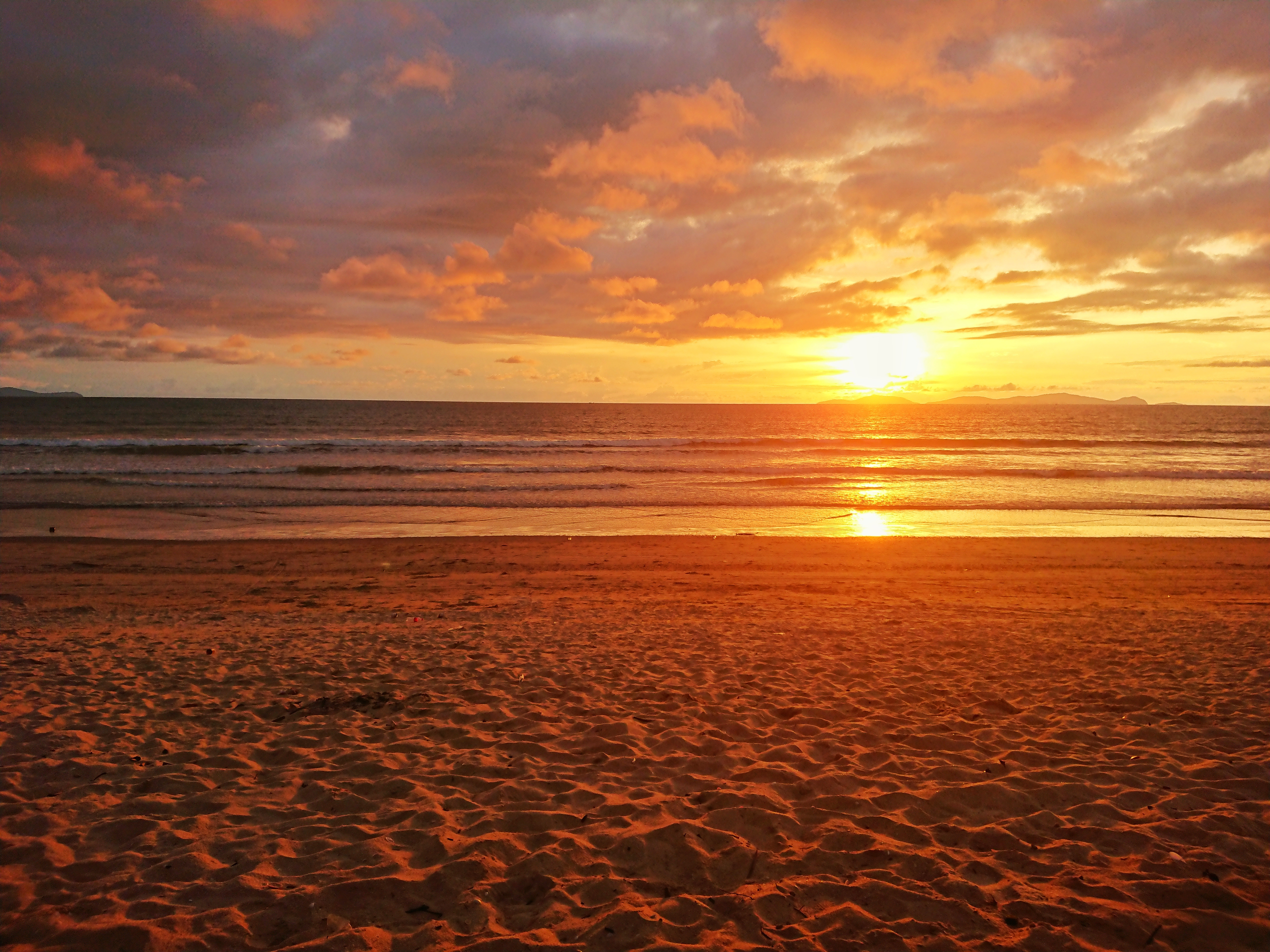
- Maungmagan beach

- Location within Myanmar
- Coordinates: 14°08′41.12″N 98°06′27.75″E
- Country: Myanmar
- Division: Taninthayi
- Township: Dawei
- Village: Maungmagan
- Time zone: UTC6:30 (MST)

Maungmagan (Burmese: မောင်းမကန်) is a village and beach located approximately 12 kilometres (7.5 mi) north-west of Dawei, the capital of Taninthayi Division. It is the second oldest beach locale established in Myanmar after Ngapali.

== Development ==
Maungmagan is an approximately 25-minute drive away from Dawei and 75 minute flight from Yangon, the principal city of Myanmar. It was a popular beach destination in Myanmar until the establishment of Chaungtha which was much closer to Yangon. The beach is being redeveloped by the Burmese government due to its proximity to Bangkok's tourist market through the newly opened (Aug 2013) Phu Nam Ron border gate. It is intended that Maungmagan and its neighbouring beaches of San Maria Bay and Nabule would become stopovers for the much promoted ecotourism to the Myeik Archipelago.
