= Shwe Twante Sayadaw =

Shwe Twante Sayadaw Ashin Vayama
- ရွှေတွံတေးဆရာတော် အရှင်ဝါယမ
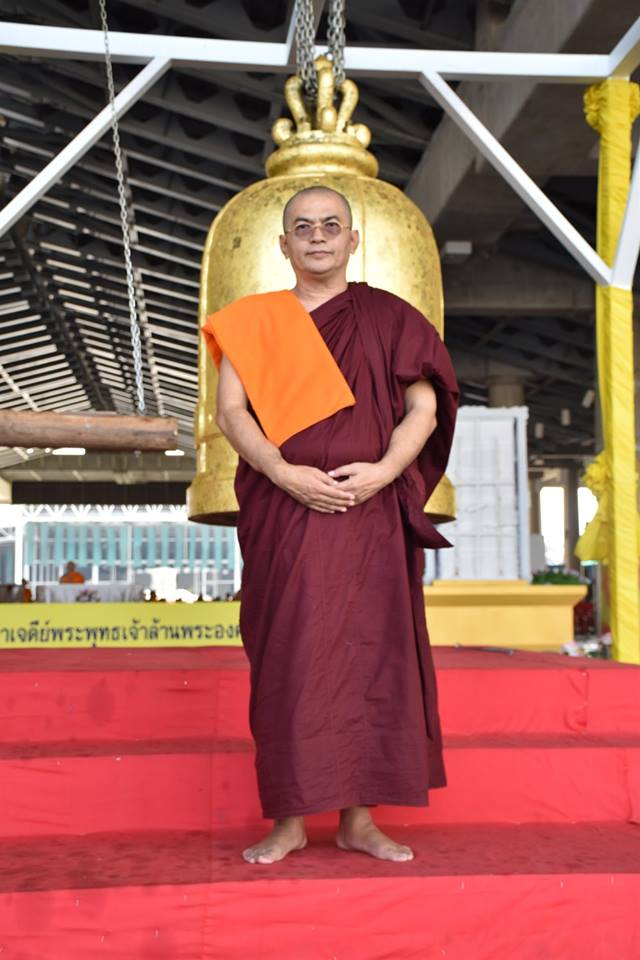
- Title: Founder of Social Fund in Myanmar.

Personal life
- Born: 2 March 1960 (age 66) Tavoy Township, Tenasserim Division, Burma
- Education: Rangoon University, GTI; RIT Yangon, Monastery of Kanbauk Kyaungthit, Insein Ywama, Pabedan Theindawgyi
- Other name: Venerable Ashin Vayama
- Occupation: Buddhist monk

Religious life
- Religion: Buddhism
- School: Theravada

Senior posting
- Teacher: Ywama Sayadaw Ashin Tilawka
- Based in: Yangon, Myanmar

Pali name
- Pali: Vāyama အရှင် ဝါယမ

Ashin Vayama (Burmese: အရှင် ဝါယမ; born 2 March 1960), also known as Shwe Twante Sayadaw, is a Burmese Buddhist monk, ex-political prisoner, ex-chairman of 8 Parties: Youth & Student Democracy Forces, founder of Yaung Ni Thit Sar Pay (YNT Publishing), and poet. He was the first monk to work in the United Arab Emirates in 2007, and was honored by the State Sangha Maha Nayaka Committee, as a Master of Buddhism. He was also honored by the Young Men's Buddhist Association and the London BOC as Buddha Capadesa.

== Missionary and charity works ==
He is founder of BOB Thai Microfinance in Mahachai, Kanchanaburi, Krokkrat and Krathumbaen. He also founded Shwe Twante Social Assistance, CS Burma(Catuddisa Sangha Burma) and Mahachai Meditation Centre. He practiced Vipassana under the guidance of Suddhammaraṁsi Sayadaw and Amyeik Thingam Sayadaw before leaving to Promote the Buddhasana in 22 countries. He visits Thailand twice a year to give meditation instructions and temporary ordination. Sayadaw's humanitarian work has included assisting the Nargis cyclone victims in 2008, civil war victims (Mon + Karen) of 2009, and the Giri cyclone victims in 2010.
