= Kaleinaung Subtownship =

Subtownship of Yebyu Township, Dawei District, Taninthayi Region, Myanmar

Kaleinaung ကလိန်အောင် မြို့နယ်ခွဲ
- Subtownship
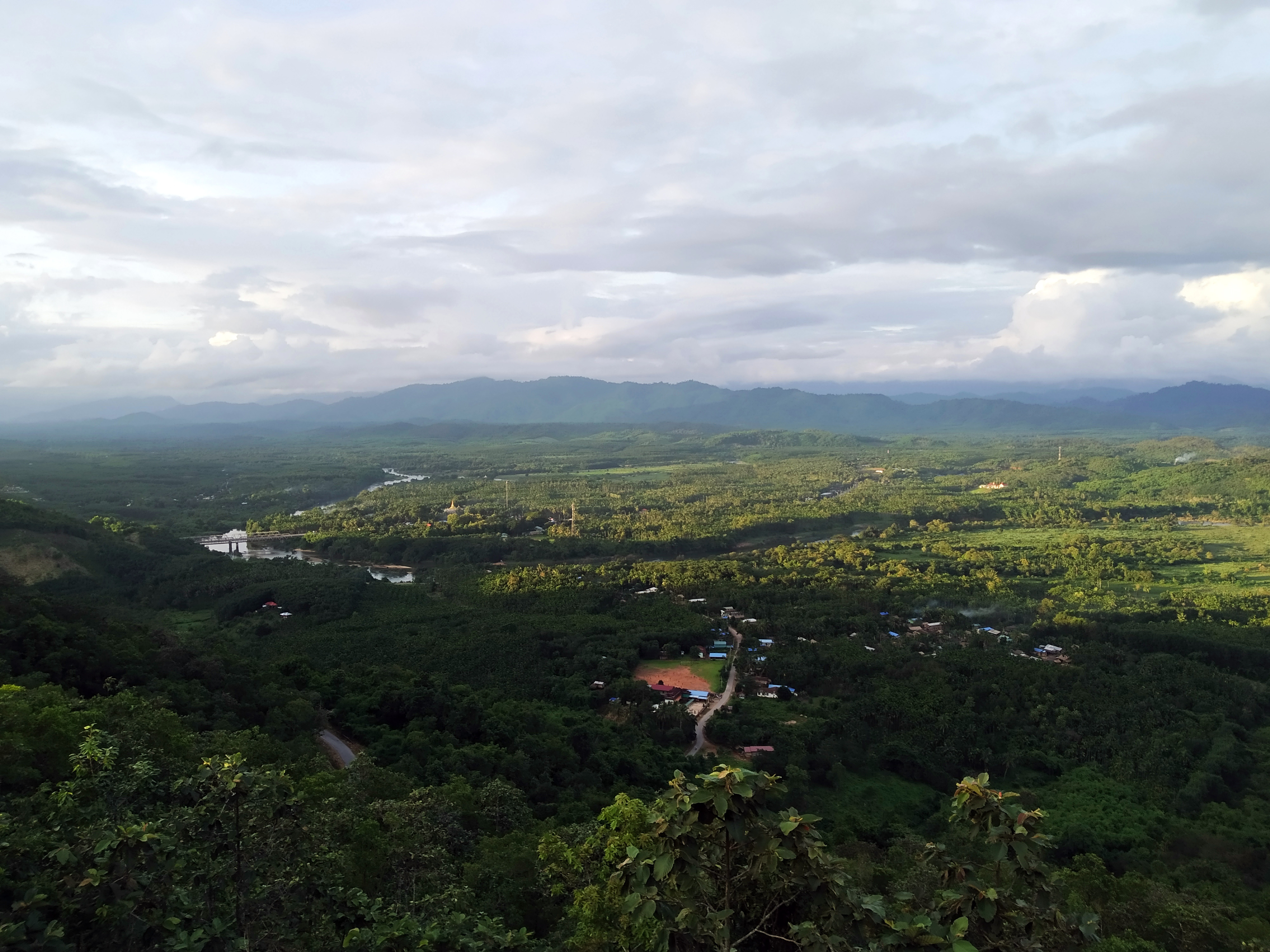
- Skyline of Kaleinaung

- Location in Myanmar
- Coordinates: 14°37′N 98°8′E
- Country: Myanmar
- Region: Tanintharyi Region
- District: Dawei District
- Township: Yebyu Township
- Capital: Myitta
- Elevation: 94 m (308 ft)
- Time zone: UTC+06:30 (MMT)

Kaleinaung Subtownship (Burmese: ကလိန်အောင် မြို့နယ်ခွဲ) is a subtownship of Yebyu Township, Dawei District, in Taninthayi Region of Myanmar. The main town is Kaleinaung, located by the Dawei River.
