= Thayetchaung =

Thayetchaung Township သရက်ချောင်းမြို့
- Township
- Location in Burma
- Coordinates: 13°51′N 98°15′E
- Country: Myanmar
- Region: Tanintharyi Region
- District: Dawei District
- Capital: Thayetchaung
- Time zone: UTC+6.30 (MST)

Thayetchaung (Burmese: သရက်ချောင်းမြို့) is a town in the Taninthayi Region, southernmost part of Myanmar.
