= Yebyu =

Yebyu Township ရေဖြူမြို့
- Township
- Location in Burma
- Coordinates: 14°14′N 98°12′E
- Country: Myanmar
- Region: Tanintharyi Division
- District: Dawei District
- Capital: Yebyu
- Time zone: UTC+6.30 (MST)

Yebyu (Burmese: ရေဖြူမြို့; Mon: ဍာ်ဗု) is a town in the Taninthayi Division, in the southernmost part of Myanmar.
