= Thayetchaung Township =

- Township
- Location in Dawei district

- Location in Burma
- Coordinates: 13°41′N 98°26′E
- Country: Burma
- Region: Taninthayi Region
- District: Dawei District
- Capital: Thayetchaung
- Time zone: UTC+6.30 (MST)

Thayetchaung Township (Burmese: သရက်ချောင်းမြို့နယ်) is a township of Dawei District in the Taninthayi Division of Burma (Myanmar). The principal town is Thayetchaung.

== Subdivisions ==
Thayetchaung Township is composed of 39 rural tracts, and one urban tract, Thayetchaung. The rural tracts are:

- Kinshey
- Nyaungzin
- Kyarinn
- Sawhpyar (Sawpya)
- Yantaung
- Thinkyun
- Thayethnitkhwa (Thayetnakwa)
- Panchishaung
- Peintaw
- Kazitadaru
- Padatchaung
- Oketu
- Titutpyin
- Sinku
- Einsheypyin
- Laba
- Meike
- Pyinhpyugyi (Pyinbyugyi)
- Pyinhpyuthar (Pyinbyutha)
- Theachaunggyi
- Alesu
- Byawithar
- Kywecham
- Winkaphaw
- Melkee
- Kayintaungpyauk
- Gonhnyinseik (Gonnyinseik)
- Sonsin
- Yaechochaung
- Kanetthiri
- Chaungwapyin
- Mindat
- Kamyaing
- Kyweminkone
- Yange
- Yaepu
- Katwe
- Kanyinchaung
- Aukthayetchaung
- Padauk
- Pedet
- Kyaukse
- Aitait (Kayin Paawt)
- Myanmar Paawt
