= Tanintharyi Nature Reserve =

Nature reserve in Myanmar

- IUCN category Ia (strict nature reserve)
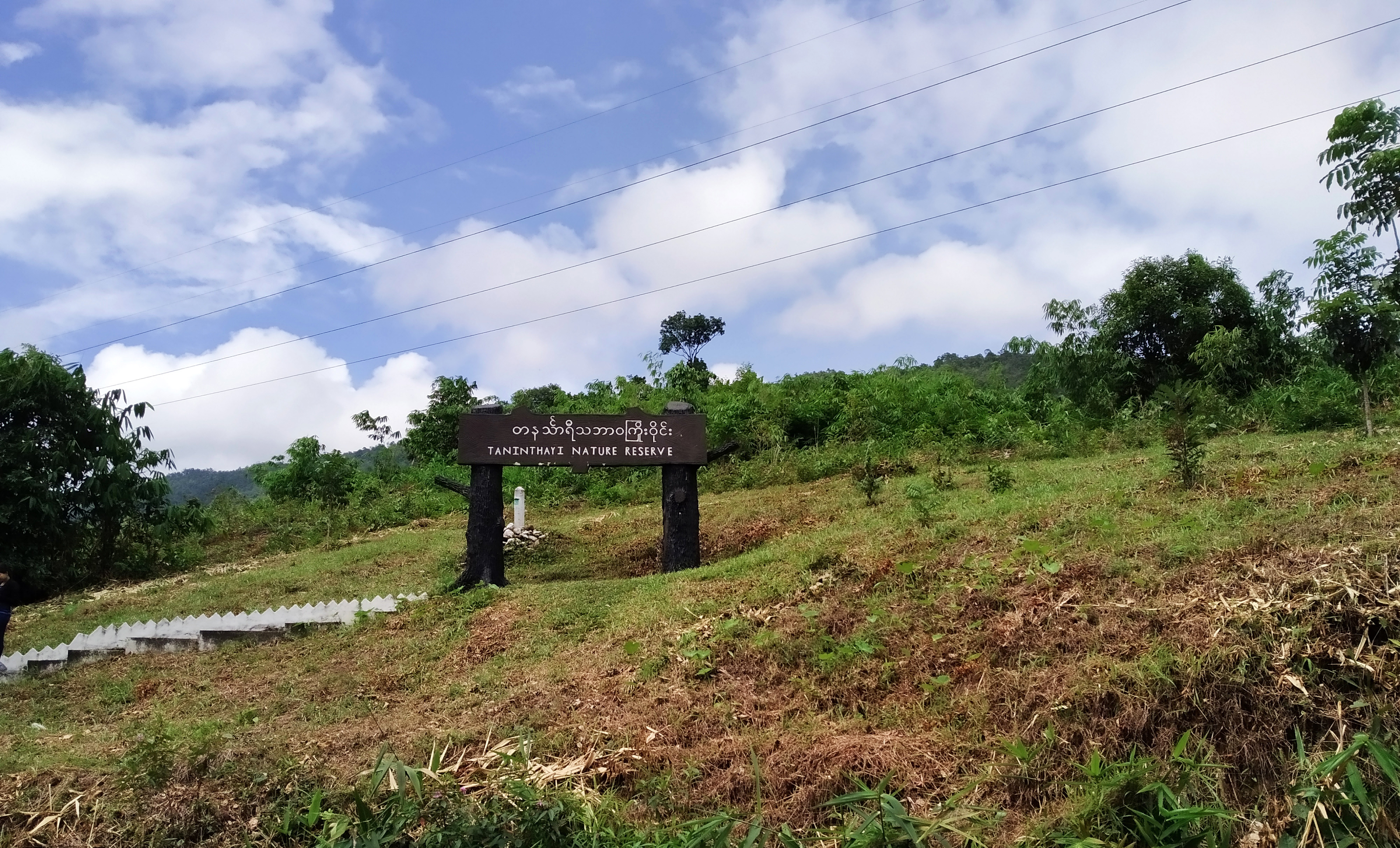

- Location within Myanmar
- Location: Yebyu and Dawei Township, Tanintharyi Region, Myanmar
- Coordinates: 14°36′00″N 98°17′00″E
- Area: 1,699.99 km^{2} (656.37 sq mi)
- Established: 2005
- Governing body: Myanmar Forest Department

Tanintharyi Nature Reserve is a strict nature reserve in Myanmar's Tenasserim Hills, covering 1,699.99 km^{2} (656.37 sq mi). It ranges in elevation from 20 to 130 m (66 to 427 ft). Most of the tropical rain forest is evergreen, interspersed with some grassland. The reserve provides habitat to Asian elephant (Elephas maximus) and Gurney's pitta (Hydrornis gurneyi). It was gazetted in 2005 for the maintenance of natural resources, scientific research and education of local people in surrounding communities.

Wildlife recorded during a camera trap survey in 2002 included binturong (Arctictis binturong), large Indian civet (Viverra zibetha), large-spotted civet (Viverra megaspila), Asian palm civet (Paradoxurus hermaphroditus), banded linsang (Prionodon linsang), yellow-throated marten (Martes flavigula) and leopard (Panthera pardus).
