= Moscos Islands =

- Island group
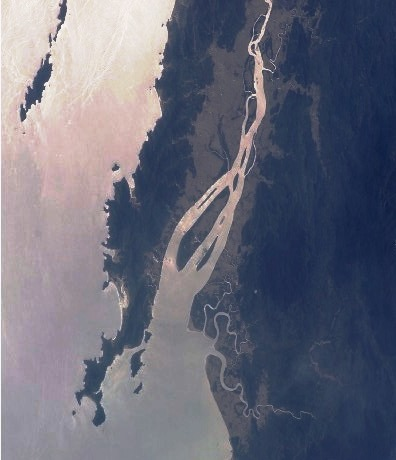
- Mouth of the Dawei River. The South Moscos can be seen on the upper left side. Photo NASA

- Location within Myanmar
- Coordinates: 14°7′N 97°48′E
- Country: Myanmar
- Region: Tanintharyi

Area
  - Total: 49.19 km^{2} (18.99 sq mi)
- Elevation: 352 m (1,155 ft)

Population
  - Total: 0
- Time zone: UTC+6:30 (Myanmar Standard Time)

The Moscos Islands are an island chain in the Andaman Sea off the northern coast of the Tanintharyi Region of southern Myanmar.

The islands are administered from the Dawei District of the Taninthayi Division. No tourism is allowed on any of the islands.

== Geography ==
This 70 km long island chain is located on average around 15 km from the shore. The total combined area of dry land on the Moscos Islands is 49.19 km^{2}.

The islands are uninhabited, but fishermen from nearby coastal locations stay in temporary settlements on certain islands during the dry season. Traditionally these people have been engaging in fishing, timber felling and collection of sea turtle eggs, swiftlet nests and forest products.

== Ecology ==
Generally all islands are covered in thick forest and they rise steeply from rocky shores. The small steep rocky islets are important as nesting places for the edible-nest swiftlets (Aerodramus fuciphagus). The beaches are breeding grounds for different species of sea turtles. In 1924, during colonial times, the whole archipelago was declared a game preserve and in 1927 a wildlife sanctuary; even then local people went to the islands to collect large numbers of turtle eggs.

Presently the whole island group is a protected area, the Moscos Islands Wildlife Sanctuary. Officially there is a limit to the number of eggs and swiftlet nests that are allowed to be collected.

== Islands ==
There are four distinct groups or clusters of islands in the chain:

- North Moscos
  - Heinze Islands 14°24′N 97°46′E, a group of four islands and one islet named after the Heinze River, the mouth of which is located about 25 km to the NNE. Heinze Bok, the largest island is 3.2 km long and 1.4 km wide. Its highest point is 312 m.
  - Bok Ye-gan group 14°18′N 97°47′E Bok Ye-gan, round and 2 km in diameter, is the only relatively large island. Its highest point is 359 m. The rest of the cluster are six scattered little islets
- Middle Moscos (Maungmagan Islands) 14°9′N 97°47′E Two larger islands and two islets. Sabyat Island is the northernmost; its highest point is 119 m. The largest island, North Island, is 6.8 km long and 3.3 km wide. Its highest point is 312 m.
- South Moscos (Launglon Bok Islands) 13°51′N 97°55′E, 6 km long Aek Bok and 10 km long Auk Bok, the main two islands, are aligned in a north-south direction. Hngettaik Kyun is a much smaller 1.5 km long island in between. Auk Bok is the largest island in the Moscos Archipelago. The South Moscos group is surrounded by coral reefs and there was a proposal in 1982 to declare the South Moscos a marine national park. There is a Tatmadaw base in the South Moscos Islands.

== See also ==
- List of islands of Burma
- Moscos Islands Wildlife Sanctuary
