= Heinze River =

River in Myanmar

Coordinates: 14°44′N 97°56′E

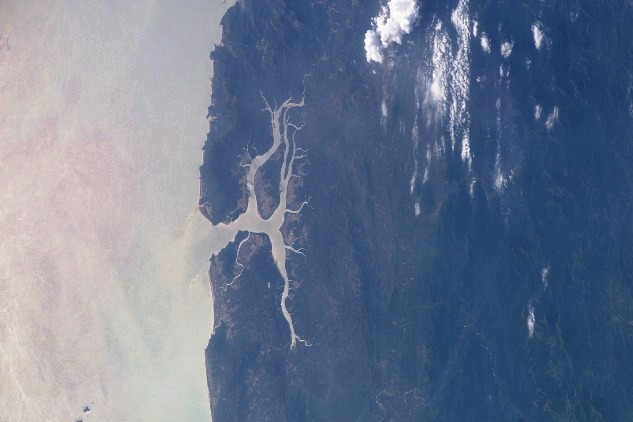
NASA picture of the Heinze River mouth. The northernmost Heinze Islands can be discerned in the lower left corner

The Heinze River, aka Heinze Chaung, is a river of Myanmar. It has its source in the Tenasserim Hills and ends in the Andaman Sea in the Tanintharyi Region coast. The Heinze Islands is a small island group located 25 km to the SSW of the mouth of the Heinze River.

== See also ==
- List of rivers in Burma
