= Li Dawei =

Li Dawei may refer to:

- Li Dawei (writer) (李大卫; born 1963), Chinese writer
- Li Dawei (director) (李大为; 1970–2018), Chinese director
- David Lee (Taiwanese politician) (born 1949), or Li Dawei, Taiwanese politician
