= Polytechnic University (Dawei) =

University in Dawei, Myanmar

- ပိုလီတက္ကနစ်တက္ကသိုလ် (ထားဝယ်)
- Former names: Technological University, Dawei; University of Computer Studies, Dawei (merged 2024)
- Motto: Future Society through innovative technology
- Established: 1982; 44 years ago as Industrial Technical High School
- Acting rector: Aung Myint Aye
- Location: Dawei, Tanintharyi Region, Myanmar; 14.172°N 98.205°E

Polytechnic University, Dawei (Burmese: ပိုလီတက္ကနစ်တက္ကသိုလ် (ထားဝယ်), romanized: pole takk naittakkasol (htarrwaal)) is a university in Dawei, Tanintharyi Region, Myanmar.

It was formed in 2024 by the merger of Technological University (Dawei) and the University of Computer Studies (Dawei). As of April 2025 the acting rector is Aung Myint Aye, whose research interests are wireless communications, radio wave propagation system and image processing.

It is one of a group of Polytechnic Universities founded by the government of Myanmar, including Naypyitaw State Polytechnic University, Polytechnic University, Myeik, and those in Kengtung, Panglong, and Ma-ubin.

== History ==
Founded as the Industrial Technical High School by the Ministry of Industry in 1982, it became a Government Technical Institute (GTI) in 1998. In 1999, it became a Government Technical College (GTC); and in 2007 it was given university status as Technological University (Dawei).

The University of Computer Studies (Dawei) began in 2002 in the Education College campus, and became a university in 2007.

The two universities combined on 21 November 2024 to form Polytechnic University (Dawei).
