= Ban Kao =

Ban Kao บ้านเก่า
- Tambon
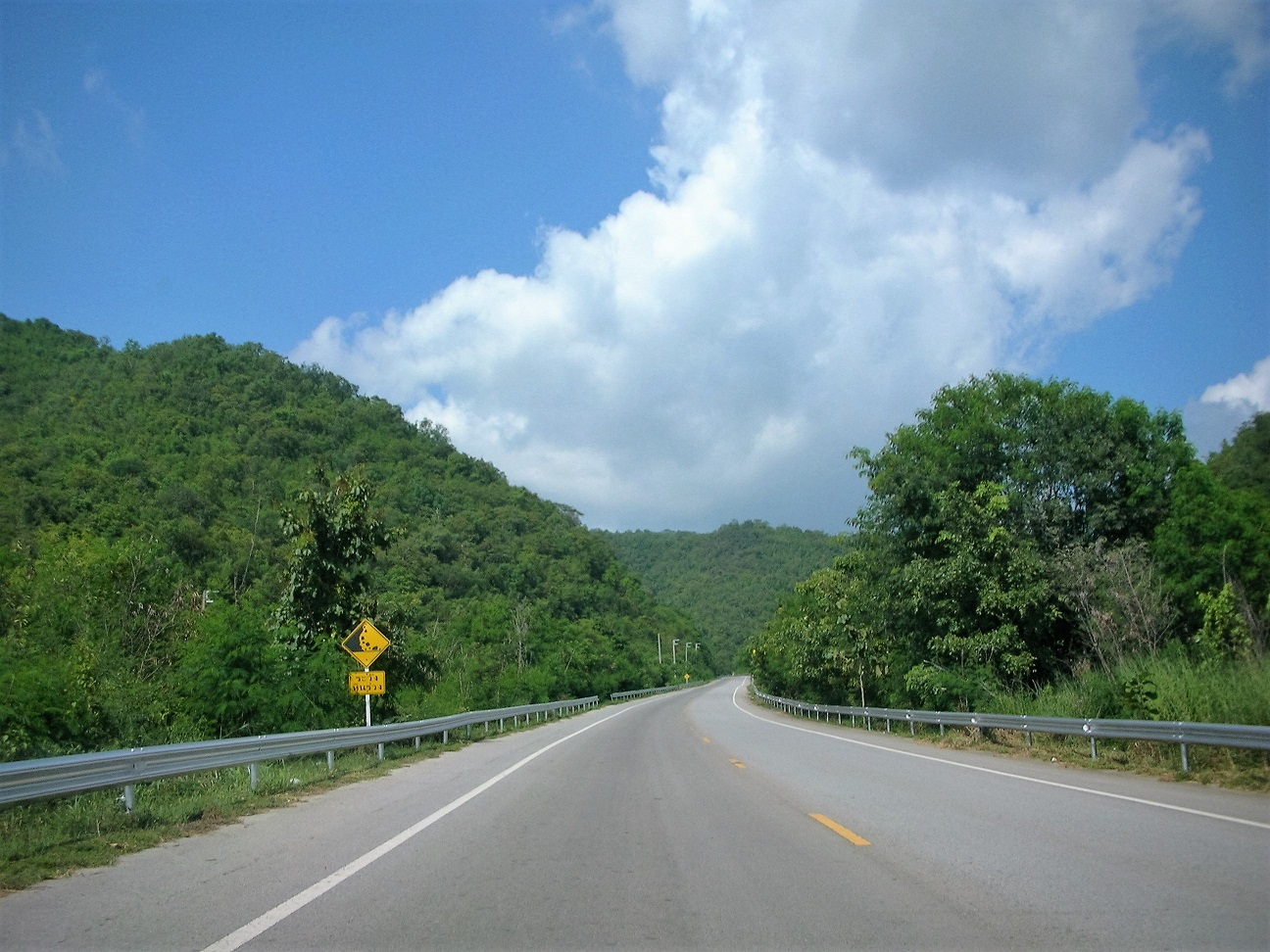
- Ban Kao Sub-district, road to Phu Nam Ron

- Location in Thailand
- Coordinates: 13°52′N 99°9′E
- Country: Thailand
- Province: Kanchanaburi
- Amphoe: Mueang Kanchanaburi

Population (2017)
  - Total: 16,147
- Time zone: UTC+7 (TST)
- Postal code: 71000
- TIS 1099: 710113

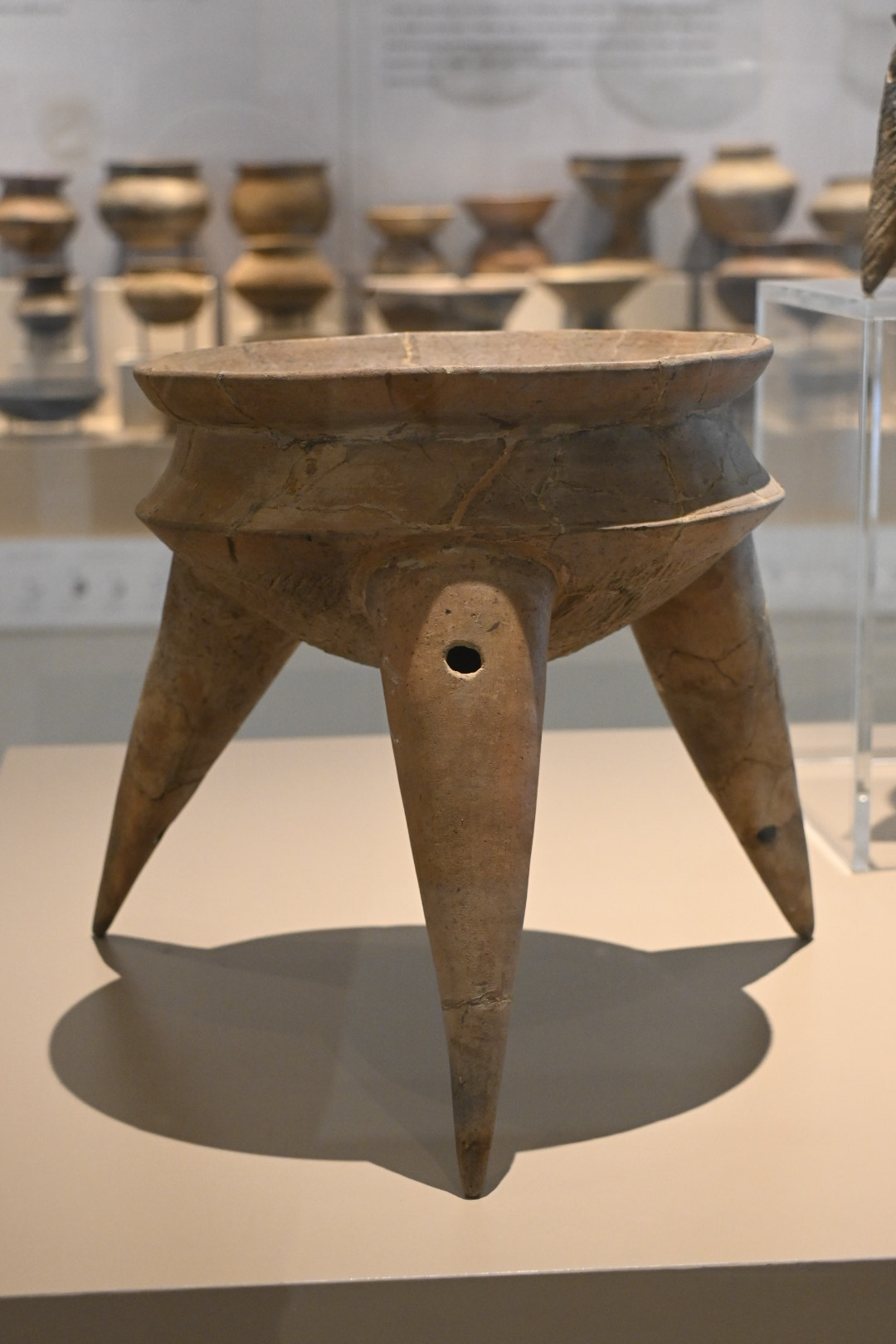
Tripod pottery found at the Ban Kao Museum

Ban Kao (Thai: บ้านเก่า, pronounced [bâːn kàw]; lit: 'old village') is a tambon (sub-district) of Mueang Kanchanaburi District, in Kanchanaburi Province, Thailand. In 2017, it had a population of 16,147 people. The tambon contains 15 villages. This network of villages had its origins in northern China and this is reinforced by pottery and ceramic fragments. The pottery and ceramic fragments found at Ban Kao highlight its archaeological significance in Southeast Asia; some of these fragments are currently being kept at the Ban Kao National Museum.

== Geography ==
Ban Kao Subdistrict is in the mountainous area of the Tenasserim Hills, close to the border with Myanmar. Phu Nam Ron, a transnational cross-border point at the western end of the sub-district, is expected to gain in importance if the planned Dawei Port Project goes ahead, along with a highway and a railway line between Bangkok and that harbor.

== History ==
In the year 1961, Per Søresen, a native of Denmark, led a Thai-Danish excavation team in the Ban Kao archaeological expeditions at a site that was approximately 400m off of the southern banks of the Khwae Noi river. Søresen's excavations has led to the recognition of three different cultural phases at the Ban Kao site. These three phases were an Early Neolithic phase, a Late Neolithic phase, and an Iron Age phase. Numerous Neolithic archaeological remains have been found in a big mound at Ban Kao. The burial site yielded many human skeletons and artifacts dating between 200 and 1300 BCE. Some of the items are preserved in a small museum in Ban Kao village. Other findings, like those of the Thai-Danish Prehistoric Expedition who excavated Ban Kao from 1960 to 1962, found skeletons with short ovoid skulls and medium and broad faces. Twenty-six skeletons were recovered majority of people lived an estimated age of less than 30 years and only two lived more than 40 years. Many of these skeletons have similar characteristics of present-day inhabitants of Thailand. Another example of objects found at the Ban Kao site is the remains of a rhinoceros sondaicus and a rhinoceros sumatraensis which are two animals that heavily populated this region, which leads researchers to believe the inhabitants of this site hunted this animal during the Neolithic period.

The subdistrict was created effective June 1973 by splitting off 7 administrative villages from the subdistrict Chorakhe Phueak of Mueang Kanchanaburi.

The burials found at the Bang Site Settlement of Ban Kao have revealed many animal remains, such as tortoise shells and pig skulls. The use of iron at sites like Ban Kao have been dated from the 1st century BCE onward. This is supported by carbon dating of ceramic and bowl fragments found at the site of Ban Kao and supports the theory of native traditions playing a bigger role in the development of new metals and tools rather than the dominating theory that China had introduced metals like bronze and iron to South East Asian sites like Ban Kao. This is supported by evidence of two iron tools found buried with the forty-five bodies recovered from the Ban Kao site.

Early interpretations of this site focused on cultures through a connection with pottery. From evidence recovered in the original excavation of the Ban Kao site, a migration model was hypothesized. The interpretation drawn from the Thai-Danish excavation team notes that the Lung-Shan migration was the most influential out of many cultures that settled the Ban Kao area. This idea was formulated due to similarities between pottery found at Lung-shan sites and at the Ban Kao site.

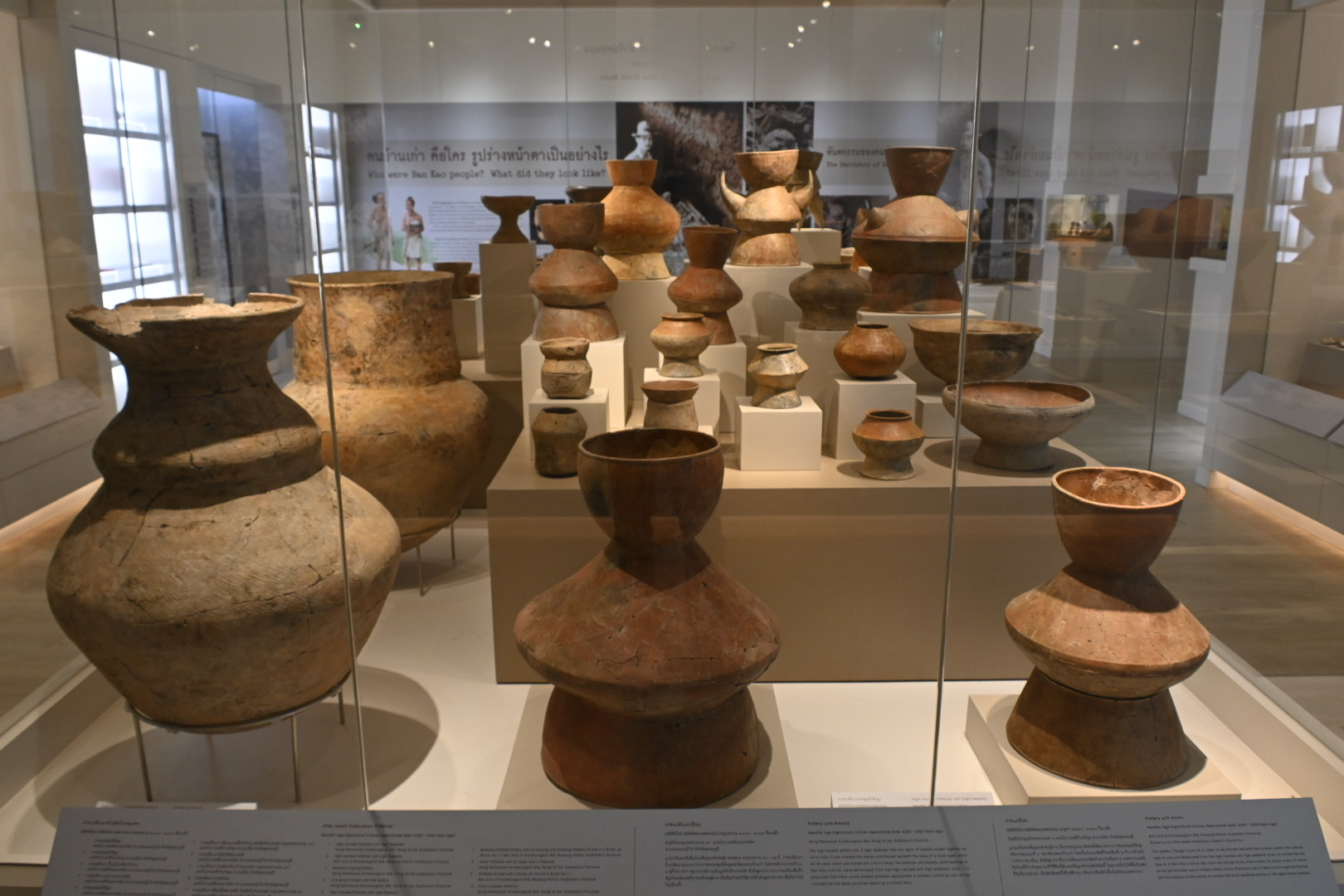
Pottery recovered at the Ban Kao site

=== Camp Ban Khao ===
Camp Ban Khao was a prisoner of war work camp during World War II on the Burma Railway. In January 1943, the first 700 British prisoners arrived, and were joined by 400 Dutch prisoners on 13 March 1943. The conditions in the camp were reasonable, and there was a shop selling bami, nasi and coffee. Until April 1943, there were no deaths reported from the camp.

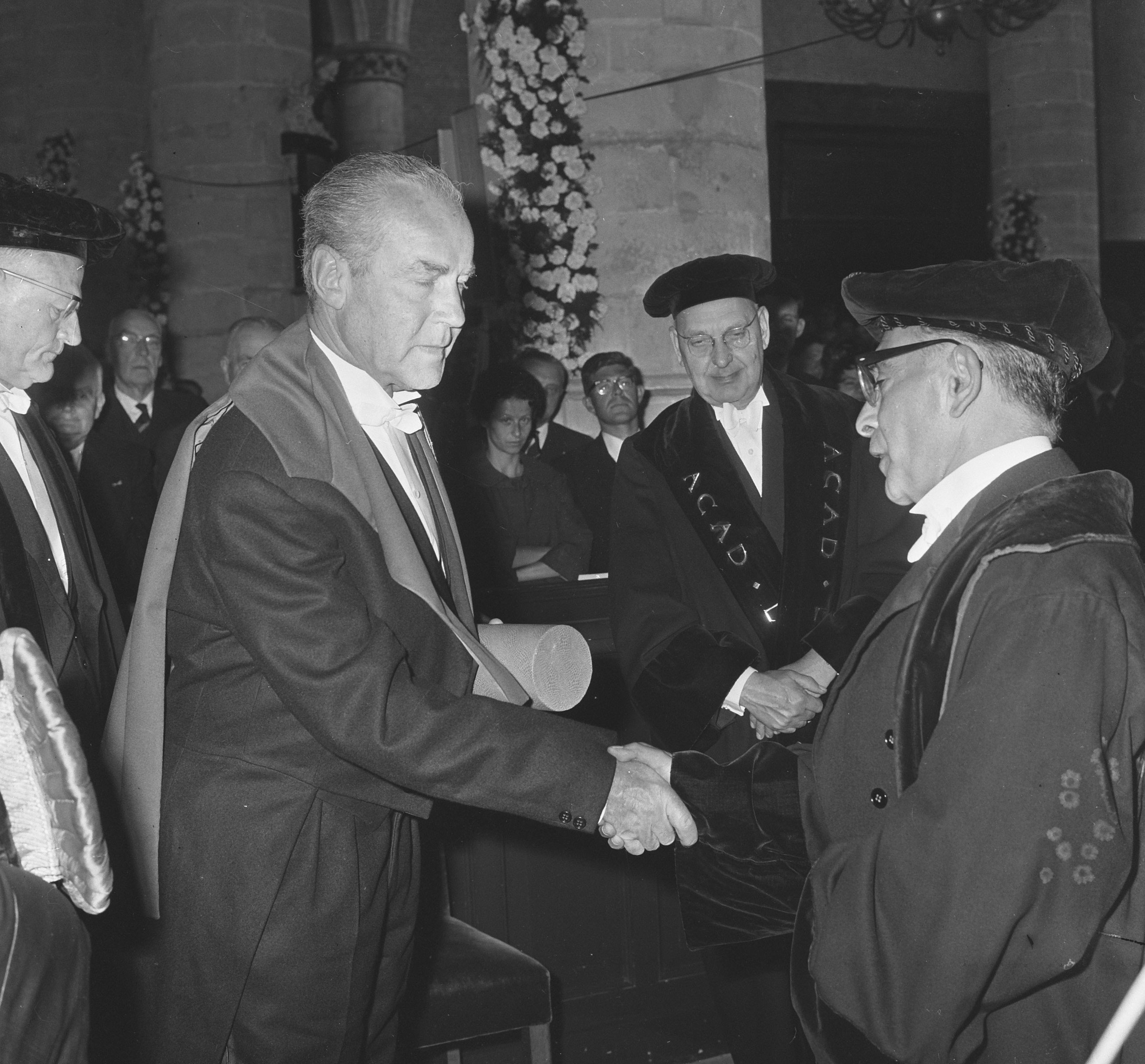
Van Heekeren (left) receives an honorary doctorate from Leiden University (1965)

The first Neolithic artefacts were discovered by Hendrik Robert van Heekeren, a Dutch prisoner and amateur archaeologist. Van Heekeren managed to hold on the stones when moved to Japan in June 1944, and hid them underneath a wooden floor. After the surrender of Japan, he passed them on to an American professor in Manila. The stones are now in the Peabody Museum of Archaeology and Ethnology. In 1960, van Heekeren returned to Thailand as part as of a Danish expedition.

== Administration ==
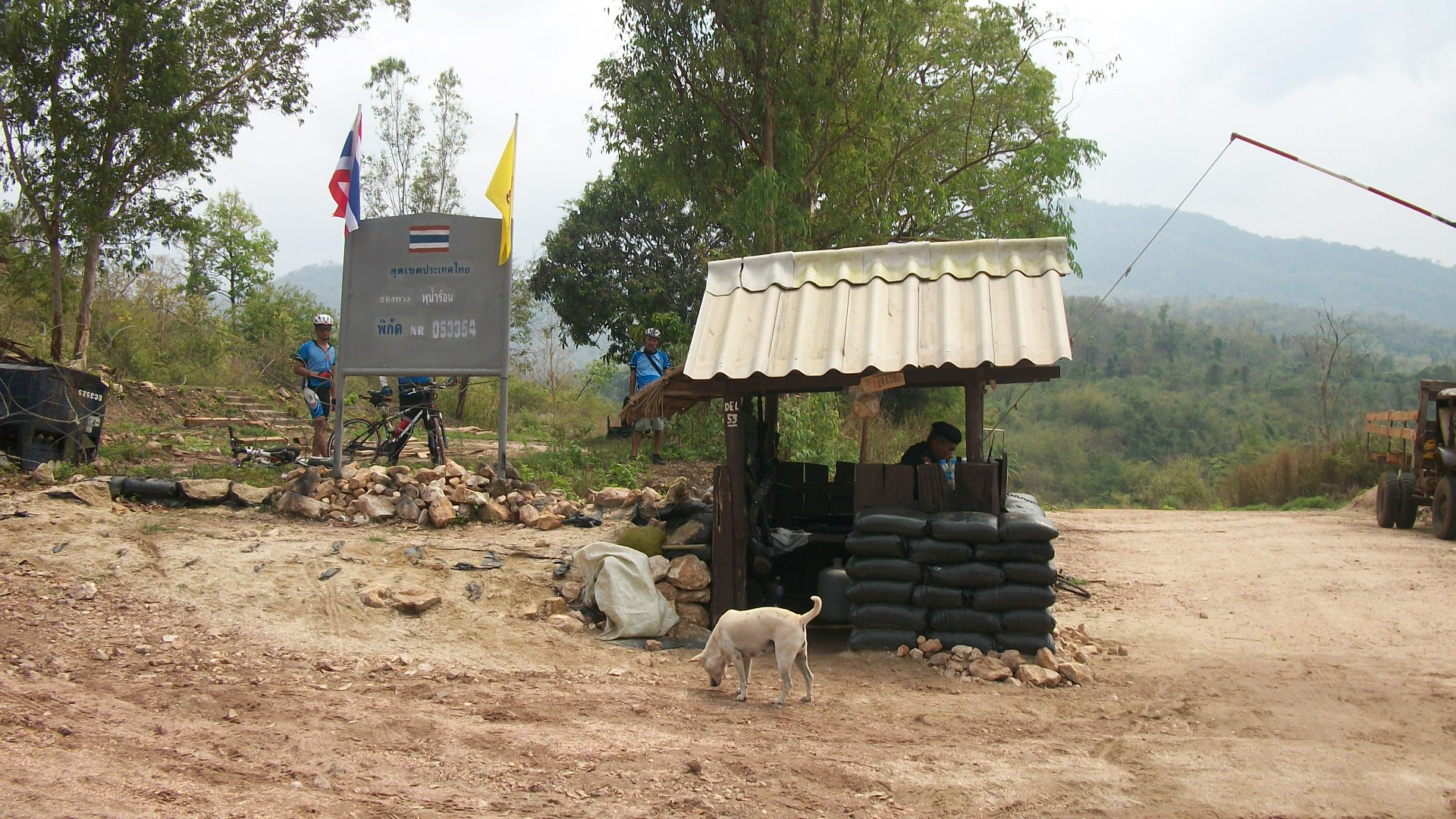
The border with Myanmar near Ban Phu Nam Ron (2011)

=== Central administration ===
The tambon is subdivided into 15 administrative villages (muban).

No.	Name	Thai
1.	Ban Kao	บ้านเก่า
2.	Ban Huai Nam Khao	บ้านห้วยน้ำขาว
3.	Ban Tapo	บ้านท่าโป๊ะ
4.	Ban Phu Noi	บ้านพุน้อย
5.	Ban Lam Thahan	บ้านลำทหาร
6.	Ban Thung Sala	บ้านทุ่งศาลา
7.	Ban Nong Ban Kao	บ้านหนองบ้านเก่า
8.	Ban To Mai Daeng	บ้านตอไม้แดง
9.	Ban Lam Tharai	บ้านลำทราย
10.	Ban Takian Ngam	บ้านตะเคียนงาม
11.	Ban Sam Nong	บ้านสามหนอง
12.	Ban Phu Nam Ron	บ้านพุน้ำร้อน
13.	Ban Tha Thung Na	บ้านทาทุ่งนา
14.	Ban Pratu Tan	บ้านประตูด่าน
15.	Ban Mai Huai Nam Khao	บ้านใหม่ห้วยน้ำขาว

=== Local administration ===
The whole area of the subdistrict is covered by the subdistrict administrative organization (SAO) Ban Kao (องค์การบริหารส่วนตำบลบ้านเก่า).
