= Dawei people =

Ethnic group in Myanmar

Dawei
Total population
- 400,000

Regions with significant populations
- Tanintharyi Region; Mon State (Thanbyuzayat Township)

Languages
- Tavoyan (Dawei)

Religion
- Predominantly Therevada Buddhism and Nat worship; minority Sunni Islam

Related ethnic groups
- Bamar; Kayin; Rakhine

The Dawei people, (Note: Burmese: ထားဝယ်လူမျိုး) also known as Tavoyan, are an ethnolinguistic group native to northern Tanintharyi Region in Myanmar (Burma). Primarily concentrated in Dawei, the Dawei people speak the Tavoyan dialect, a divergent dialect of Burmese. They are officially classified as a sub-group of the Bamar.

== Culture ==
There are three kinds of Dawei dance: Ayai dance, Yan dance, and Ozi dance. Traditional dances and folk songs are commonly performed during festivals. Dawei music includes a heterogeneous mix of love songs, calls for rain, verse songs, rubber-pounding songs, long drum, and chants.

Historically, the Dawei were large producers of tin but have since moved toward rubber, teakwood, fish, pineapples, mangos, and cashew nuts.

=== Religion ===
The Dawei people practice Buddhism and venerate nats. Most villages in Dawei Township feature nat shrines called Ywartawtshin. Unlike most Myanmar Buddhists who traditionally pay respect to elders and superiors at the end of Vassa, the Dawei pay homage to elders and superiors at the beginning of Waso, based on lunar timing. They maintain a historical chronicle (yazawin) which includes the arrival of the Buddha and the nurturing of the first Buddhist king of Thagara by the hermit Gawinanda.

A small number of Dawei people are Sunni Muslims, mainly due to intermarriage with Indian Muslims, descending from Gurkha troops of the Anglo-Burmese Wars, and the influence of the Malays.

== Sources ==
- McCormick, Patrick (7 April 2025), "22. The development of the Tavoyan dialect of Burmese and the hidden role of language contact", in Darquennes, Jeroen; Salmons, Joseph C.; Vandenbussche, Wim (eds.), Handbücher zur Sprach- und Kommunikationswissenschaft / Handbooks of Linguistics and Communication Science [HSK] 45/2, De Gruyter, pp. 389–407, doi:10.1515/9783110443011-022, ISBN 978-3-11-044301-1
- Dawei (PDF) (Report). Operation Myanmar. Asia Harvest. 2025.
- Maw Maw Aye (2015). "Preservation of Dawei People's Traditional Customs" (PDF). University of Yangon, Myanmar.
- Moore, Elizabeth Howard (November 2013). "The sacred geography of Dawei: Buddhism in peninsular Myanmar (Burma)". Contemporary Buddhism. 14 (2). Informa UK Limited. doi:10.1080/14639947.2013.832084.
