= Phu Nam Ron =

Phu Nam Ron พุน้ำร้อน
- Htee Kee
- Location within Thailand
- Elevation: 350 metres (1,150 ft)

Third Approach
- Location: Myanmar–Thailand border
- Range: Tenasserim Hills
- Coordinates: 13°53′39″N 99°4′55″E

Phu Nam Ron (Thai: พุน้ำร้อน) is a pass across the Tenasserim Hills on the border between Thailand and Myanmar, at an elevation of 350 metres (1,150 ft). The border checkpoint on the Thai side is in Ban Kao subdistrict, Mueang Kanchanaburi district, Kanchanaburi province.

== Border posts ==
Htee Khee is the name of the new town in the Tanintharyi Region on the Myanmar side of the border which is currently being developed. The Phu Nam Ron pass is expected to gain in importance if the planned Dawei deepwater port project goes ahead, which includes a highway and a railway line between Bangkok and that harbor.

The road on the Burmese side leads to Dawei via Sinbyudaing and Myitta; it has undergone upgrades.

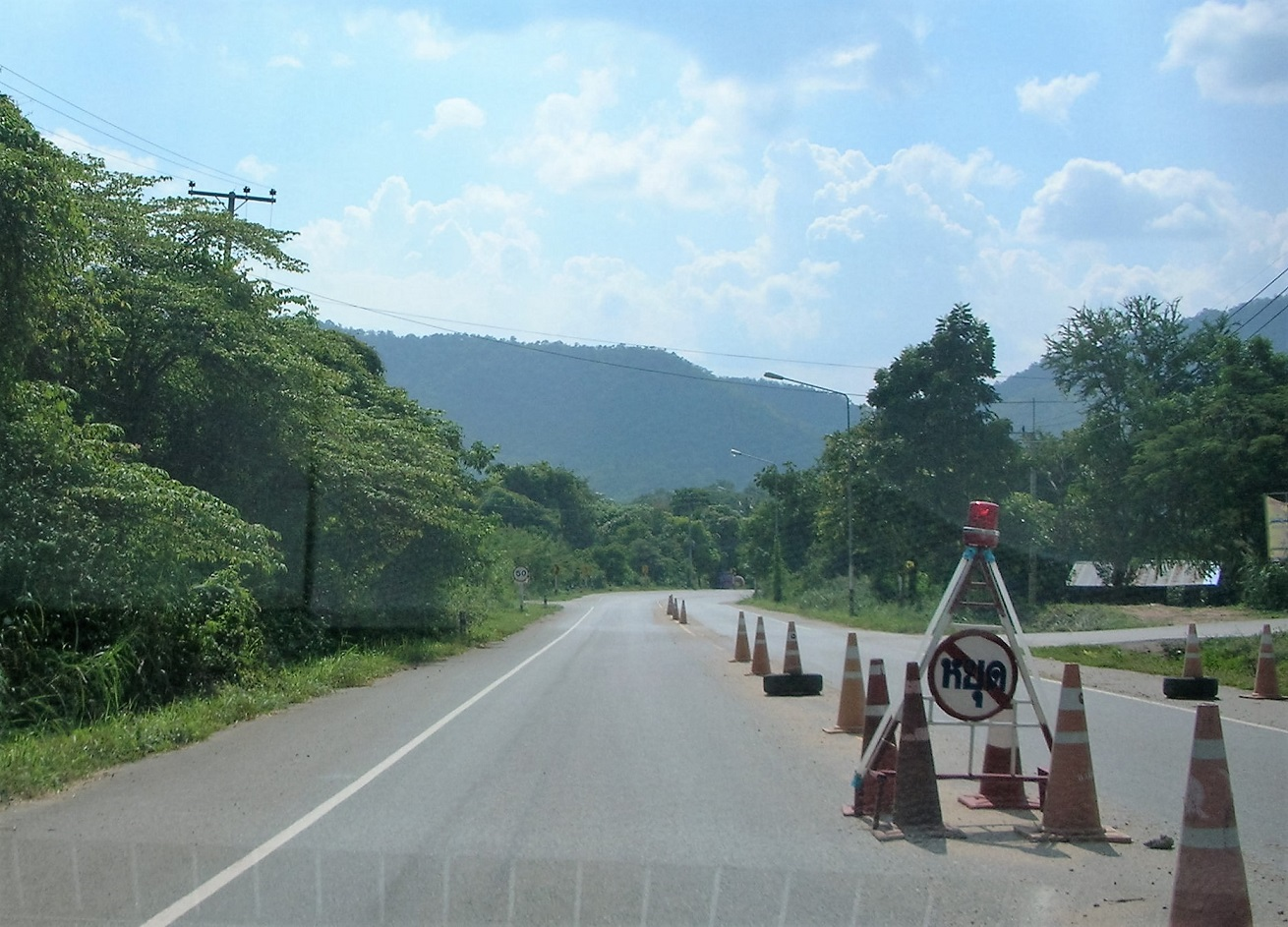
Road control post before the border

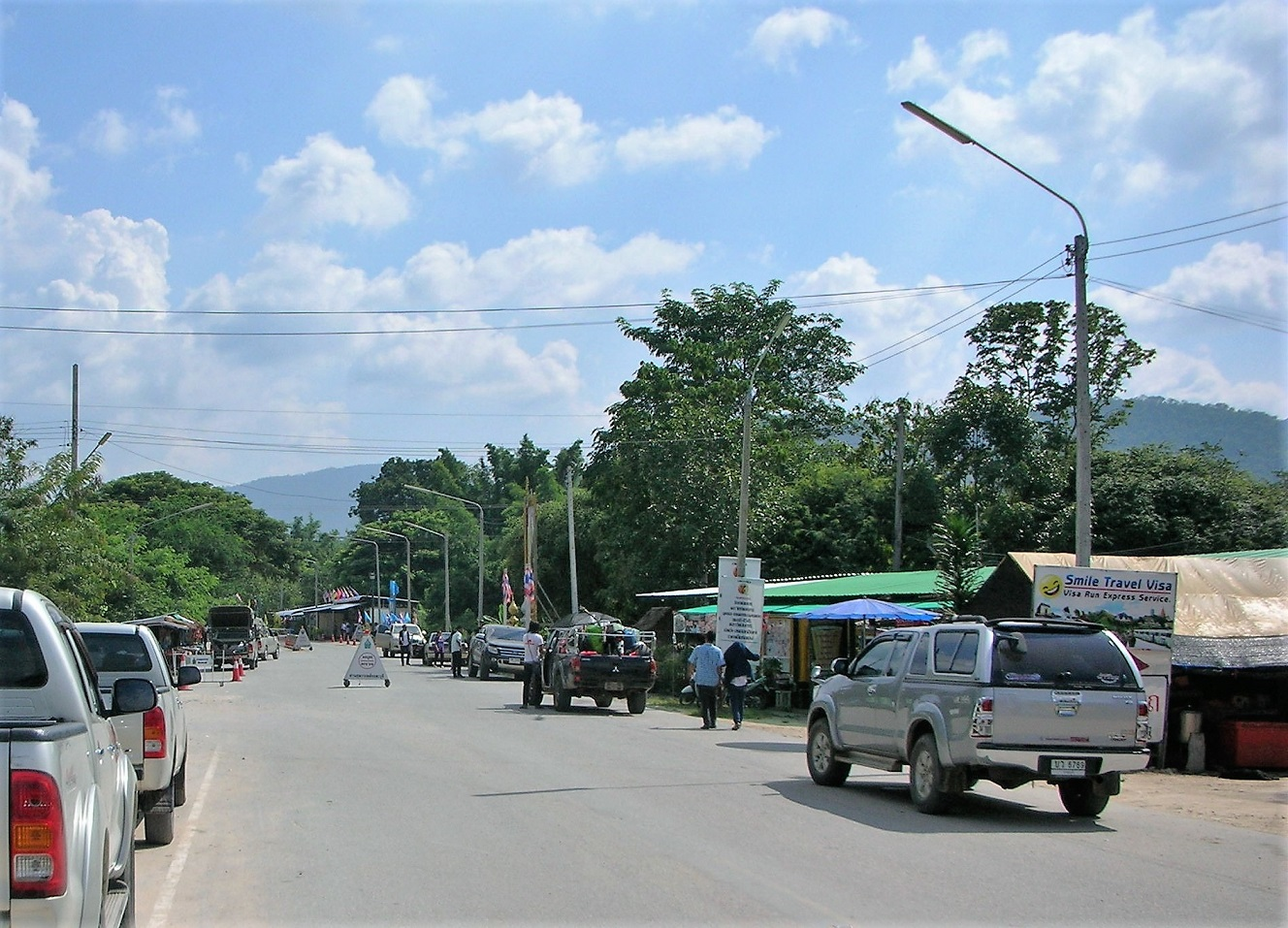
Phu Nam Ron border post
