= Launglon Township =

- Township
- Location in Dawei district

- Location in Myanmar
- Coordinates: 14°05′N 98°12′E
- Country: Myanmar
- Region: Tanintharyi Division
- District: Dawei District
- Capital: Launglon
- Time zone: UTC+6.30 (MMT)

Launglon (Burmese: လောင်းလုံးမြို့နယ်) is a town in Dawei District, in Tanintharyi Division, Myanmar. It is about 13 miles from Dawei.

== Notable people ==
- Ma Chit Po
