= Yebyu Township =

Yephyu Township
- Township
- Location in Dawei district

- Location in Burma
- Coordinates: 14°15′N 98°12′E
- Country: Burma
- Region: Taninthayi Region
- District: Dawei District
- Capital: Yebyu
- Time zone: UTC+6.30 (MST)

Yebyu Township (Burmese: ရေဖြူမြို့နယ်) is a township of Dawei District in the Taninthayi Division of Myanmar. The principal town is Yebyu. The eastern portion of the township includes Kaleinaung Subtownship, an unofficial division used by the Township for statistical and administrative ease.
