= Visit Myanmar Year =

Myanmar tourist initiative

Visit Myanmar Year or Visit Burma Year was an initiative starting in 1996 by the Burmese government to encourage tourism in Myanmar. The year was seen as a way to improve Myanmar's international reputation and economic output. In preparation for the year, numerous new tourist attractions were built, controversially with the use of mass forced labor and evictions. The year underperformed expectations amidst a global call for a boycott of tourism led by democratic figurehead Aung San Suu Kyi, but nevertheless increased tourism compared to previous years.

== Background ==
In the early to mid-1990s, Myanmar was ruled by the State Law and Order Restoration Council (SLORC), a military junta. Under the SLORC, human rights abuses were rampant, dissuading tourists from visiting Myanmar. Compared to neighboring countries like Thailand, which brought in millions of tourists per year, Myanmar averaged about 200,000 tourists per year. Although tourism had overtaken staples of Myanmar's economy like rice in terms of money generated, it still was lacking and did not generate much money. To combat the negative image of Myanmar due to their human rights abuses, Myanmar used the release of popular democratic figurehead Aung San Suu Kyi from house arrest in 1995 with a year in which tourism would be promoted, called Visit Myanmar Year, in 1996.

== Preparations ==
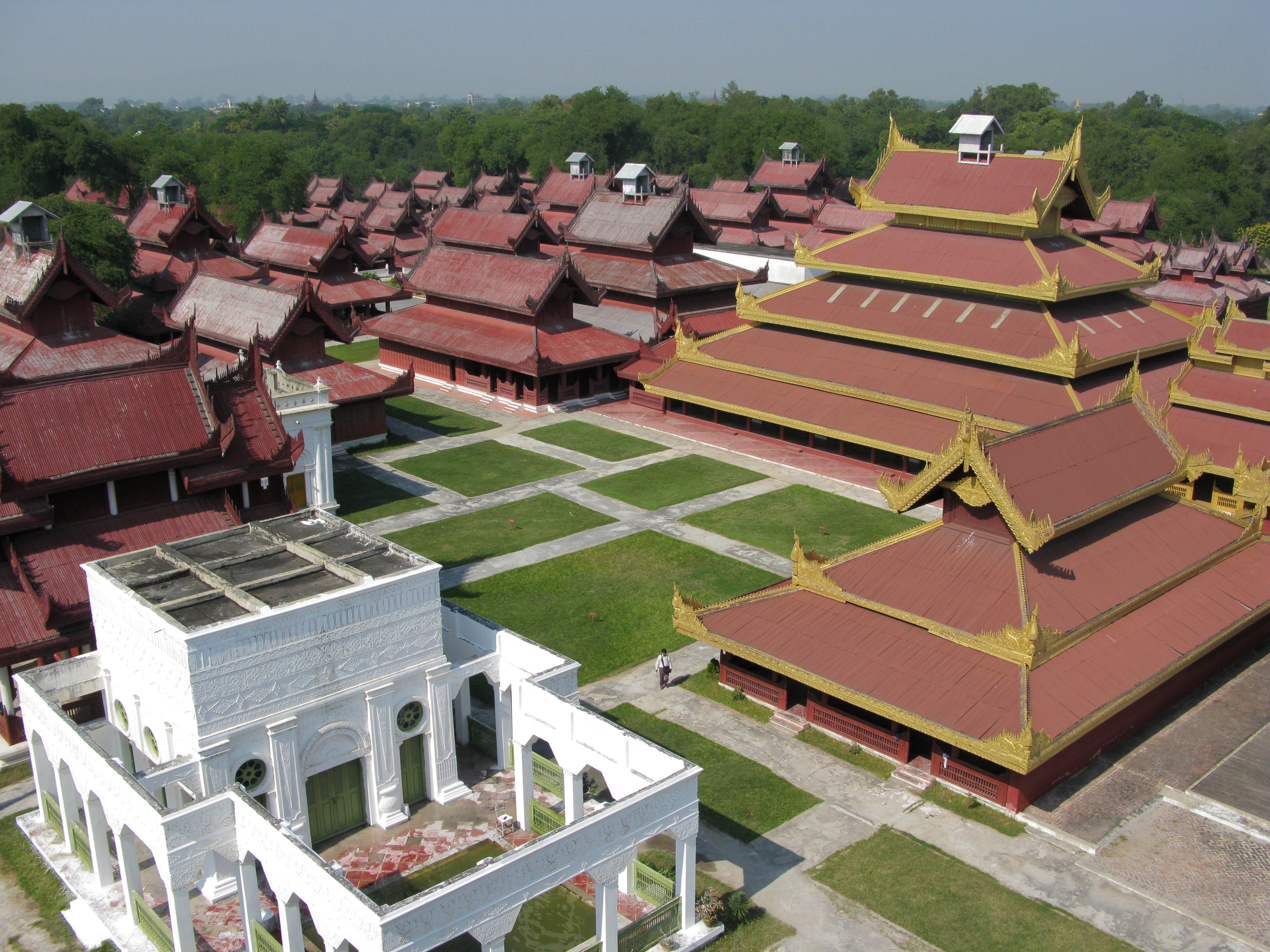
The golden palace in Myanmar, which was reportedly restored using forced labor.

In 1990, Myanmar passed the Myanmar Tourism Law, which limited the government monopoly on the tourism industry, and instead allowed for private companies to oversee hotels and transport businesses. Three years later, Myanmar passed the Myanmar Hotel and Tourism Law, which established the importance of hotels in the travel industry. In order to allow for foreign visitors to enter Myanmar, the SLORC eased restrictions on foreign travel by issuing tourist visas which were valid for one month. However, people such as human rights advocates and political figures were often denied these visas.

In preparation for upcoming tourists, Myanmar sought to restore existing infrastructure and build new amenities to accommodate for the large number of travelers it was expecting. The SLORC widened and paved dirt roads and replaced gold leafs on its pagodas. Numerous new hotels were constructed, controversially with the use of forced labor. One estimate gave that between 1993 and 1997, the number of hotels in Myanmar increased from 43 to 450. Some of these new hotels were funded by shady industries, such as in the Inle Lake region, where 35% of new hotels built were funded by a drug kingpin and the corrupt construction sector. Two new domestic airlines started service in Myanmar, and a new airport arrival hall was opened in Yangon. Tourist sites were also refurbished, many of them with the help of forced labor. In Bagan, Yozo Yokota, the United Nations Special Rapporteur on Human Rights in Myanmar, reported in 1995 that forced labor was being used to refurbish a temple complex. Yokota also reported that similar actions took place in the construction of new railways and a new airport in Pathein. In Mandalay, the golden palace was also restored by forced laborers, with citizens being conscripted three days a month on restoring the palace unless they could pay a fee. To make room for renovations and new tourist attractions, some local Burmese citizens were forcibly removed from their homes. One such occurrence was during the construction of the Myanmar Golf Club in Yangon. To make room for the development, the army first blockaded the area and later arrested one member of each family living in the area, with the remaining families being forced to move to a new town 25 kilometers outside of the city without any compensation. In total, the International Confederation of Free Trade Unions estimated that about one million inhabitants in Myanmar had been expelled from their homes to make room for tourists.

== Event ==
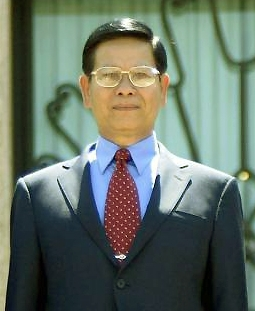
Khin Nyunt oversaw the opening ceremony for Visit Myanmar Year.

Visit Myanmar Year was officially started on November 18, 1996, with a ceremony in Yangon. The ceremony was presided over by second-in-command Khin Nyunt, who gave a speech recognizing the significance of tourism and as a display that Myanmar welcomed the rest of the world. The ceremony consisted of a marching band performing the national anthem, flag-bearers, and various dancing girls. Few journalists were present, and those who were felt as if they "had arrived by accident". One journalist from Japan compared the opening ceremony to those of North Korea. In a piece for The New York Times, Margaret Erhart described her visit to Myanmar in 1996, where she visited Yangon, Mandalay, and Bagan. Erhart described the trip favorably, praising the newly constructed hotels and cuisine in Myanmar. In an attempt to increase numbers from Visit Myanmar Year, the year was extended for a longer period than intended.

=== SLORC detainments ===
Tourist activities were heavily regulated with tourists being instructed to not take photos from plane windows as they flew in. In October 1996, the SLORC reportedly detained tourists who approached Aung San Suu Kyi's home in Yangon and tried to listen to her speech. Tourists who tried to approach her home on University Avenue were pushed away by police, much to their chagrin. After student demonstrations in Yangon, Aung San Suu Kyi herself was temporarily put back in house arrest. Additionally, a group of foreign bicyclists was detained under the notion that they were spies.

=== Results ===
Myanmar initially expected around 500,000 tourists, but later cut that number down to around 250,000. The actual number of tourists who visited varies, but estimates are between 200,000 and 490,000. While these numbers underperformed expectations, they still met or exceeded Myanmar's annual tourism figures at the time.

== Responses ==
The viewpoints of tourists visiting Myanmar were mixed. Many tourists felt they faced an ethical decision concerning whether to visit Myanmar and by so doing fund an authoritarian military junta. In a piece for the South China Morning Post, Fionnuala McHugh said that she "did not relish" the fact that she would be funding a corrupt government or walking down roads constructed by slave labor. Seth Mydans of The New York Times claimed that there was no way to avoid making a "moral choice" when visiting Myanmar.

Other tourists had warmer feelings about visiting Myanmar for a variety of reasons. In a newsreel from the Associated Press, a French and Dutch tourist interviewed stated that they disregarded political reasons for not visiting and instead wanted to see the culture of Myanmar. In her piece for the New York Times, Erhart defended her decision to travel to Myanmar because she believed the money she spent would contribute to improving the economy and lives of Burmese citizens. In Mydans' piece for The New York Times, a Greek tourist exhibited the same outlook, saying that he'd visited countries with unpleasant governments before and that the money he spent in Myanmar would help the citizens. Some locals in Myanmar also exhibited confidence that Visit Myanmar Year would be a success. Bernard Pe–Win, the owner of a hotel in Yangon, believed that the year would be a success because even encouraging foreign citizens to enter the country would be a big step for Myanmar.

=== Boycott ===
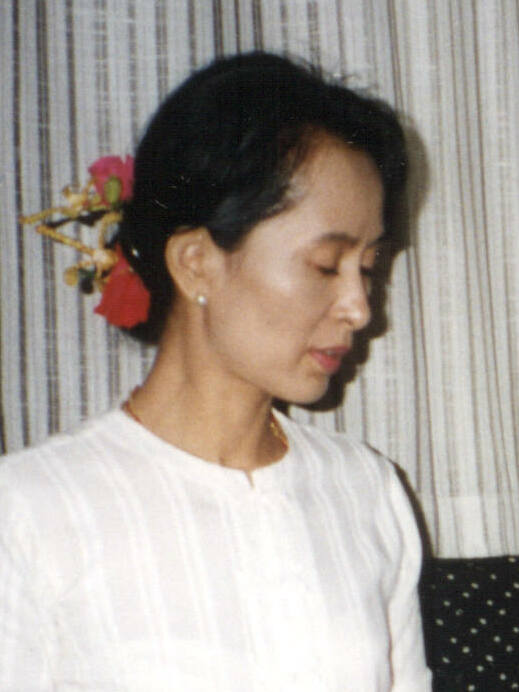
Aung San Suu Kyi, figurehead of the call for a tourism boycott of Myanmar, in 1995

In response to the announcement of Visit Myanmar Year, democratic resistance leader Aung San Suu Kyi led a movement from multiple non-governmental organizations (NGO's) and human rights groups to boycott traveling to Myanmar during the year. Aung San Suu Kyi claimed that any money put into the country would only pay for the SLORC's totalitarian efforts against Burmese citizens. She later went on to say that as long as money keeps coming in to fund the SLORC, there is less motivation for the regime to change. Aung San Suu Kyi was joined by Yvette Mahon, coordinator of the Burma Action Group, who claimed that visiting Myanmar would legitimize an autocratic regime and Derek Fatchett, the shadow foreign affairs minister, who said the price of a holiday in Burma could be someone's life. In a piece for The Harvard Crimson, David S. Grewal, chair of the Harvard Burma Action Group, advocated against the annual Harvard travel series guidebook for Myanmar due to its use of forced labor. Some arguments were made against the proposed Myanmar travel boycott, with reasons including that travelling to Myanmar would keep it under international scrutiny and that tourists could better understand the issues in the country if they saw them firsthand.

== Aftermath ==
Following Visit Myanmar Year, tourist numbers did not increase greatly but nevertheless steadily increased. The boycott efforts led by Aung San Suu Kyi had lessened by the 2000s. In 2016, a similar Visit Myanmar Year was planned to mimic the efforts of 1996.
