= Li Dawei (writer) =

Chinese writer

- 李大卫
- Born: 1963 (age 62–63); Beijing, China
- Occupation: Novelist
- Writing career
- Genres: Essay, short stories, novel

Li Dawei (Chinese: 李大卫; born 1963) is a Chinese writer born in 1963. He began writing poetry at age 17, and in 1985 graduated from Beijing Normal University with a degree in English. Since 1987, he has been publishing theoretical works about art and literature and in 1997, he published his first novel, Dream Collector, which is centred with a young musician and a talking cat that is later converted into a cartoon star. He won Select Short Stories Monthly prize in 1996 and, in 1997, was short-listed for Lu Xun Literary Prize, China's arguably highest award for literature. He was given October Prize in 2000. He currently resides in Los Angeles. He is also a columnist for Caijing Magazine.

His novel Love, Revolution, And How Tomcat Haohao Goes To Hollywood was published by Knaus Publishing House, in Munich, in 2009.

== Works ==
=== Books ===
- 念珠·击壤 (Lijiang Publishing House, 1987)
- 集梦爱好者 (Dream Collector; Authors' Publishing House, 1997)
- China Wenxueshi Building oder: Heimatstraße West 2a, published in Das Leben ist jetzt；Suhrkamp Publishing House, Frankfurt 2003
- 卡通猫的美国梦 (A Cartoon Cat's American Dream; Shandong Literary Publishing House, 2005)
- China Wenxueshi Building - via Jia Yuan Ovest 2, published in Cina - Undici scrittori della rivoluzione pop; Gruppo Editoriale il Saggiatore S.p.A., Milano 2006

=== Magazine articles ===
- "写作笔记 (Notes on writing)". Olive Tree Literature Society (6). 2001.
- "恐龙是这样变酷的 (Thus Dinosaurs Become Cool)". Zuojia Zazhi (Writer's Journal) (1). 2005. Archived from the original on January 10, 2007.
- "巴别塔的猫 (Cats of Babel)". Zuojia Zazhi (Writer's Journal) (5). 2006. Archived from the original on 2016-03-03.
- (2006) Magic Mountain Club, published in du - Magazine for culture No. 6/7, Swiss
