= Myitta Subtownship =

Myitta မေတ္တာမြို့နယ်ခွဲ
- Subtownship
- Location in Burma
- Coordinates: 14°9′N 98°31′E
- Country: Burma
- Region: Taninthayi Region
- District: Dawei District
- Township: Dawei Township
- Capital: Myitta
- Elevation: 198 m (650 ft)
- Time zone: UTC+6.30 (MST)

Myitta Subtownship (Burmese: မေတ္တာမြို့နယ်ခွဲ) is a subtownship of Dawei Township, Dawei District in the Taninthayi Region of Myanmar. The main town is Myitta (Matamyu), located on the western side of the Tenasserim Range near the confluence of two tributaries of the Great Tenasserim River.

== History ==
At the time of the 1765–67 Burmese–Siamese War General Maha Nawrahta of the Royal Burmese armed forces led his 20,000-strong main southern army to invade Siam via the Myitta Pass.

During the Japanese conquest of Burma, the forces of the Imperial Japanese Army began their invasion crossing the Tenasserim Hills through Myitta Pass from Thailand. In the night of 17/18 January 1942 they attacked Myitta town. The three 6th Burma Rifles companies of the Tavoy garrison posted there were not able to put up resistance and fled into the forests.

As of 2013 a road is being built to Dawei from Bangkok through the Phu Nam Ron border pass that will improve communication with Myitta town.
