= Dawei, Myanmar =

Dawei ထားဝယ် (Burmese) Tavoy
- Capital Town
- Dawei
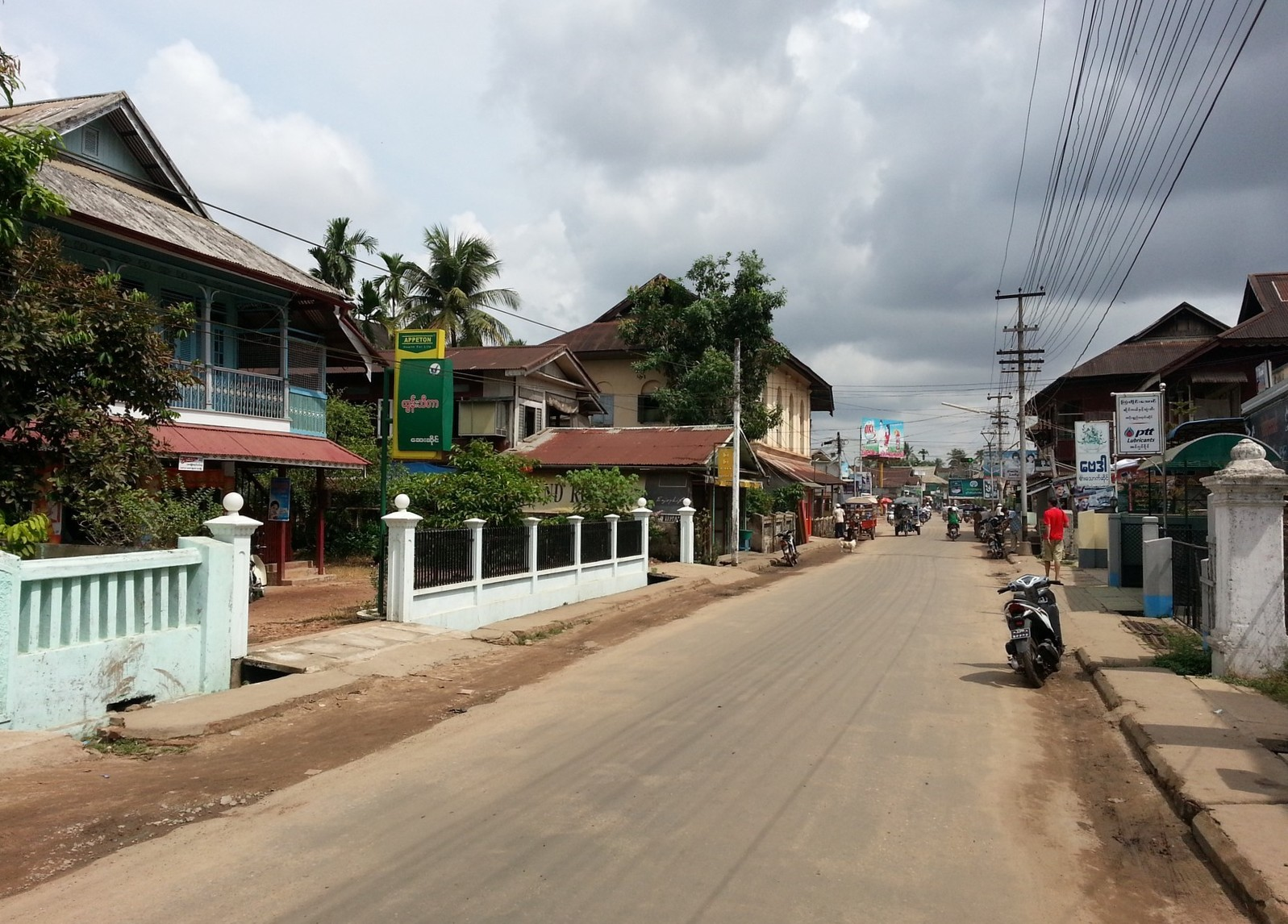

- Location in Myanmar (Burma)
- Coordinates: 14°05′0″N 98°12′0″E
- Country: Myanmar
- Region: Tanintharyi Region
- District: Dawei District
- Township: Dawei Township

Government
  - Mayor: U Min Min Latt (USDP)

Population (2014)
  - Total: 125,605
  - Religions: Theravada Buddhism
- Demonym: Dawegian
- Time zone: UTC+6.30 (MMT)
- Area code: 59

Dawei, (Note: Burmese: ထားဝယ်, MLCTS: hta: wai, pronounced [dəwɛ̀]; Mon: ဓဝဲါ, pronounced [həwài]; Thai: ทวาย, RTGS: Thawai, pronounced [tʰā.wāːj]) formerly known as Tavoy, (Mon :ထဝဲါ) is a city in south-eastern Myanmar and is the capital of the Tanintharyi Region, formerly known as the Tenasserim Division, on the eastern bank of the Dawei River Canal. The city is about 614.3 km (381.7 mi) southeast of Yangon. Its population (2014 census) is 125,605.

Dawei is a port at the head of the Dawei River estuary, 30 km (18.6 mi). from the Andaman Sea. As a result, the city is prone to flooding during the monsoon season. Dawei is also the name of one of Myanmar's 135 officially recognized ethnic groups.

== Etymology ==
Dawei derives from the Mon language term hawai (Mon: ထဝဲါ; /həwai/), which means 'to sit cross-legged', in reference to the Buddha's sitting posture on the palin (throne).

== History ==
The area around the Dawei River estuary has been inhabited for centuries by Dawei, Mon, Kayin, and Thai mariners.

As the ancient site, Sagara City, old Dawei, which is approximately 6 miles north of the present city, has so many traces of Pyu culture, it was recognized as one of the province capitals in the ancient Pyu era. The evidence of burial urns, beads, coins and other features of Pyu culture have been excavated in the area by the Department of Archaeology and National Museum, Myanmar.

From the 11th to the 13th centuries, Dawei was part of the Pagan Empire. From 1287 to 1564, Dawei became part of the Sukhothai Kingdom and its successor, the Ayutthaya Kingdom (Siam). From 1564 to 1594, Dawei was part of the Toungoo Kingdom of Burma. Siam temporarily regained the city between 1594 and 1614. From 1614 to the 1740s, Dawei was the southernmost city under Burmese authority and was defended by a Burmese garrison. In the late 1740s, during the Burmese civil war of 1740–1757, Dawei, along with the northern Tenasserim coast, was taken over by Siam. Burma regained the city in 1760 and extended its control over the entire Tenasserim coast, in 1765. The Tenasserim coast was ceded to the British after the First Anglo-Burmese War (1824–1826).

After independence in 1948, the city became part of the Tenasserim Division, which also included today's Mon State. In 1974, Mon State was carved out of Tenasserim and Dawei became the capital of the truncated division. In 1989, the city's English name was changed from Tavoy to Dawei, and Tenasserim became Tanintharyi.

== Climate ==
Dawei features an extreme tropical monsoon climate (Köppen climate classification Am), similar to Sittwe further north-west. There is a substantial dry season from November to March, but in the wet season the influence of local mountains causes Dawei to receive as much as 1,300 millimetres (51 in) precipitation per month. Apart from the Chocó region of Colombia, and the area around Mount Cameroon in Africa, it is possibly the wettest lowland tropical region in the world.

Climate data for Dawei (1991–2020)
Month	Jan	Feb	Mar	Apr	May	Jun	Jul	Aug	Sep	Oct	Nov	Dec	Year
Record high °C (°F)	37.0 (98.6)	38.3 (100.9)	39.0 (102.2)	40.7 (105.3)	40.8 (105.4)	36.1 (97.0)	37.8 (100.0)	34.5 (94.1)	37.2 (99.0)	37.2 (99.0)	37.8 (100.0)	37.5 (99.5)	40.8 (105.4)
Mean daily maximum °C (°F)	33.6 (92.5)	34.5 (94.1)	35.3 (95.5)	35.5 (95.9)	32.4 (90.3)	29.9 (85.8)	29.0 (84.2)	28.8 (83.8)	29.8 (85.6)	32.2 (90.0)	33.5 (92.3)	33.3 (91.9)	32.3 (90.1)
Daily mean °C (°F)	26.0 (78.8)	26.9 (80.4)	28.3 (82.9)	29.4 (84.9)	28.0 (82.4)	26.5 (79.7)	25.8 (78.4)	25.7 (78.3)	26.2 (79.2)	27.3 (81.1)	27.1 (80.8)	26.0 (78.8)	26.9 (80.4)
Mean daily minimum °C (°F)	18.5 (65.3)	19.4 (66.9)	21.3 (70.3)	23.2 (73.8)	23.6 (74.5)	23.1 (73.6)	22.6 (72.7)	22.6 (72.7)	22.6 (72.7)	22.4 (72.3)	20.7 (69.3)	18.7 (65.7)	21.6 (70.9)
Record low °C (°F)	10.0 (50.0)	10.6 (51.1)	12.5 (54.5)	16.8 (62.2)	20.0 (68.0)	20.0 (68.0)	20.0 (68.0)	20.0 (68.0)	20.5 (68.9)	16.7 (62.1)	11.1 (52.0)	8.9 (48.0)	8.9 (48.0)
Average precipitation mm (inches)	9.5 (0.37)	14.6 (0.57)	40.9 (1.61)	111.4 (4.39)	541.7 (21.33)	977.4 (38.48)	1,339.4 (52.73)	1,325.1 (52.17)	807.7 (31.80)	259.0 (10.20)	52.2 (2.06)	6.7 (0.26)	5,485.7 (215.97)
Average precipitation days (≥ 1.0 mm)	1.0	1.4	3.5	5.6	20.1	26.9	28.8	28.3	24.9	16.6	3.9	0.9	161.9
Source 1: World Meteorological Organization
Source 2: Sistema de Clasificación Bioclimática Mundial (records)

== Transport ==
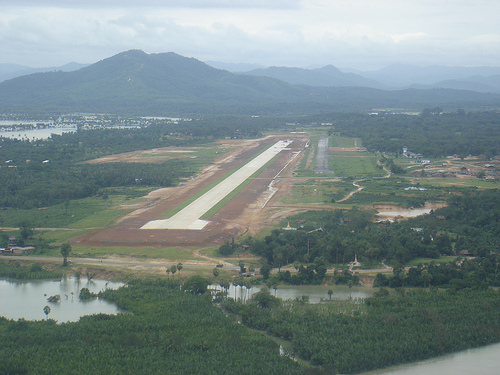
Dawei Airport

Only recently was Dawei connected to the rest of Myanmar by road and rail. A transnational highway and a railway line across the Tenasserim Hills connecting Dawei and Bangkok are planned if a proposed deep water port project goes ahead. This port could significantly reduce Singapore-bound traffic when completed.

=== Dawei Airport ===
The airport serves as the domestic airport for the city of Dawei and the neighbouring towns. The government plans to upgrade the airport to serve as a hub for tourism.

=== Dawei Railway Station ===
It is the southernmost station and terminus in Myanmar. However the railway was partly constructed for a further 40 km approximately to the south towards Min Dat bridge and south Myanmar. Work ceased on this line in about 2012 but several partly constructed sections with bridges over rivers are visible on Google Earth.

== Economy ==
There are plans to construct a deep water port in Dawei. In November 2010, the Myanmar Port Authority signed a US$8.6 billion deal with Italian-Thai Development to develop the seaport at Dawei. The Dawei Special Economic Zone would become Myanmar's first special economic zone (SEZ), which includes plans to develop a 250 square kilometres (97 mi^{2}) industrial estate, with sea, land (railway and road) infrastructure links to Thailand, Cambodia, and Vietnam, as well as a gas pipeline to Thailand's Kanchanaburi Province and commercial and residential developments.

The development of the SEZ has been linked to land confiscations and land grabs from farmers of upwards of 63,768 acres (25,806 ha) (direct) and 153,919 acres (62,289 ha), potentially displacing 500,000 Dawei natives. The project has been opposed by a significant portion of the local ethnic population.

Dawei longyis (sarong) are one of the area's well-known products. The area produces rubber, dried fish, and teakwood. It also produces cashew nuts and betel nuts and exports them through local traders to China, India, and Thailand. Dawei is also known for its variety of tropical fruits such as pineapples, a variety of mangoes, mangosteens, and durian. There is one fruit called zin thi (in Dawei language), which can only be found in Dawei and surrounding areas.

== Higher education ==
- Dawei Education College
- Dawei University
- Technological University, Dawei
- Computer University, Dawei
- Government Agricultural Institute, Dawei
- Nursing Training School

== Notable sites ==
- Maungmagan Beach
- Maungmagan Hot Springs
- Shwe Taung Sar Pagoda, Payagyi
- Pe Hot Springs
- Launglon Bok Islands
- Paradise Beach
- Grand Father Beach
- Sin Htauk Beach
- Wa Zwam Chaung Waterfall and hot springs
- Ka Lone Htar Creek
- Sargara Ancient City (Old town of the present Dawei)
- Mokhti Ancient City
- Thayet Chaung Waterfall

== Gallery ==
Public building with a clock tower (2005)

Traditional wooden house (2005)

Two-storey wooden house (2005)

== Notable residents ==
- Ba Swe, 2nd Prime Minister of Union of Burma
- Richard Bartholomew
- Ngwe Gaing, Burmese artist
- Ma Chit Po, only woman to be awarded the Thura Medal

== See also ==
- List of railway stations in Myanmar
- Phu Nam Ron (Htee Kee)
