= Dawei District =

District of Tanintharyi Region, Myanmar

Coordinates: 14°05′N 98°28′E

Dawei District (Burmese: ထားဝယ်ခရိုင်) is a district of the Taninthayi Region of Myanmar. The district covers an area of 13,792 km^{2}, and had a population of 493,576 at the 2014 Census.

Location in Tanintharyi Region

== Administrative divisions ==
=== Townships ===
The district contains the following townships:

- Dawei Township
- Launglon Township
- Thayetchaung Township
- Yebyu Township

=== Sub-townships ===
- Kaleinaung Subtownship
- Myitta Subtownship
