= Dawei Township =

- Township
- Location in Dawei district

- Location in Burma
- Coordinates: 14°05′N 98°12′E
- Country: Burma
- Region: Taninthayi Region
- District: Dawei District
- Capital: Dawei

Area
  - Total: 6,829 km^{2} (2,637 sq mi)

Population (2014)
  - Total: 146,964
  - Density: 21.52/km^{2} (55.74/sq mi)
- Time zone: UTC+6.30 (MST)

Dawei Township (Burmese: ထားဝယ်မြို့နယ်) is a township of Dawei District in the Taninthayi Division of Myanmar. The principal town is Dawei.

== 2014 demographics ==
Historical population
| Year | Pop. | ±% |
|---|---|---|
| 1973 | 66,041 | — |
| 1983 | 119,612 | +81.1% |
| 2014 | 125,605 | +5.0% |
Source: ,

The 2014 Myanmar Census reported that Dawei Township had a population of 125,605. The population density was 29.4 people per km^{2}. The census reported that the median age was 28.5 years, and a sex ratio of 92 males per 100 females. There were 45,753 households; the mean household size was 4.6.

== Attractions ==
- Shwedaungza Pagoda, Peinnetaw Ward
- Shin Mokhti Buddha, Shin Mokhti Village
- Shinbinkayu Pagoda, Kanyon Ward
- Shin-u-aw Pagoda, Peinnetaw Ward
- Shindatwe Pagoda, Maungmeshaung Village
- Shwethalyaung Buddha, Kanaingda Village
