= Tanintharyi Region =

Region of Myanmar

Tanintharyi Region တနင်္သာရီတိုင်းဒေသကြီး
- Region

Other transcription(s)
  - MLC Transcription System: ta.nangsari tuing: desa. kri:
  - Central Thai: ตะนาวศรี
- Flag
- Nickname: TNI
- Location of Tanintharyi Region in Myanmar
- Coordinates: 13°0′N 98°45′E
- Country: Myanmar
- Region: Lower
- Capital: Dawei (Tavoy)

Government
  - Chief Minister: U Zaw Naing Oo
  - Cabinet: Tanintharyi Region Government
  - Legislature: Tanintharyi Region Hluttaw
  - Judiciary: Tanintharyi Region High Court

Area
  - Total: 43,344.9 km^{2} (16,735.6 sq mi)
  - Rank: 5th
- Highest elevation (Myinmoletkat Taung): 2,072 m (6,798 ft)

Population (2014)
  - Total: 1,408,401
  - Rank: 12th
  - Density: 32.4929/km^{2} (84.1562/sq mi)
- Demonym: Tanintharian

Demographics
  - Ethnicities: Bamar, Dawei, Myeik, Rakhine, Kayin, Salone, Malay, Mon, Thai
  - Religions: Buddhism 87.5% Christianity 7.2% Islam 5.1% Hinduism 0.1%
- Time zone: UTC+06:30 (MMT)
- ISO 3166 code: MM-05
- HDI (2017): 0.552 medium · 8th

Tanintharyi Region ( (Note: Burmese: တနင်္သာရီတိုင်းဒေသကြီး, pronounced [tənɪ́ɰ̃θàjì táɪɰ̃ dèθa̰ dʑí]; Mon: ဏၚ်ကသဳ or ရးတၞင်သြဳ); formerly Tenasserim Division and Tanintharyi Division) is a first-level administrative division of Myanmar, covering the long narrow southern part of the country on the northern Malay Peninsula, reaching to the Kra Isthmus. It borders the Andaman Sea to the west and the Tenasserim Hills, beyond which lie Thailand, to the east. To the north is the Mon State. There are many islands off the coast, the large Mergui Archipelago in the southern and central coastal areas and the smaller Moscos Islands off the northern shores. The capital city of the region is Dawei. Other important cities include Myeik (Mergui) and Kawthaung. The region covers an area of 43,344.9 square kilometres (16,735.6 sq mi), and had a population of 1,406,434 at the 2014 Census.

== Names ==
Tanintharyi has historically been known by a number of names, reflecting changes in administrative control throughout history, as the region changed hands from the Kedah Sultanate, to the Hanthawaddy, Ayutthaya and Konbaung kingdoms, and British Burma. The region is called Tanah Sari in Malay, Tanao Si (Thai: ตะนาวศรี, RTGS: Tanao Si, pronounced [tā.nāːw sǐː]) in Thai, ဏၚ်ကသဳ and တနၚ်သြဳ in Mon. In 1989, the Burmese government officially changed the division's English name from Tenassarim to Tanintharyi.

== History ==
Tanintharyi Region historically included the entire Tanintharyi salient–today's Tanintharyi Region, Mon State, and southern Kayin State. In the first millennium, its southern coastline formed part of the ancient emporium named Takkola in the Geōgraphikē Hyphēgēsis of Ptolemy. and in the Buddhist texts, Mahāniddesa and Milinda Panha. Takkola itself was also one of the five kingdoms in the confederative polity of Tun Sun. Meanwhile, the northernmost region was part of the Thaton Kingdom before 1057. The entire coastline later became part of King Anawrahta's Pagan Empire after 1057. After the fall of Bagan in 1287, the area fell to the Siamese kingdom of Sukhothai, and later its successor Ayutthaya Kingdom. The region's northernmost border was around the Thanlwin (Salween) river near today's Moulmein.

The region reverted to Burmese rule in 1564 when King Bayinnaung of Toungoo Dynasty conquered all of Siam. Ayutthaya had regained independence by 1587, and reclaimed the southern half of Tanintharyi in 1593 and the entire peninsula in 1599. In 1614, King Anaukpetlun recovered the northern half of the coast to Dawei but failed to capture the rest. Tenasserim south of Dawei (Tavoy) remained under Siamese control. Myeik (Mergui) port was a principal centre of trade between the Siamese and Europeans.

For nearly seven decades, from the middle of the 18th century to the early 19th century, Burma and Siam were involved in multiple wars for control of the coastline. Taking advantage of the Burmese civil war of 1740–1757, the Siamese cautiously moved along the coast to the south of Mottama in 1751. The winner of the civil war, King Alaungpaya of Konbaung Dynasty recovered the coastline to Dawei from the Siamese in 1760. His son King Hsinbyushin conquered the entire coastline in 1765. In the following decades, both sides tried to extend the line of control to their advantage but they both failed. The Burmese used Tanintharyi as a forward base to launch several unsuccessful invasions of Siam (1775–1776; 1785–1786; 1809–1812); the Siamese too were unsuccessful in their attempts to retake Tanintharyi (1787 and 1792). (On the northern front, Burma and Siam were also locked in a struggle for the control of Kengtung and Lan Na.)

Burma ceded the region south of Salween River to the British after the First Anglo-Burmese War (1824–1826) under the Treaty of Yandabo. The British and the Siamese signed a boundary demarcation treaty on 20 June 1826, and another one in 1868. Mawlamyine (Moulmein) became the first capital of British Burma. The British seized all of Lower Burma after the Second Anglo-Burmese War of 1852, and moved the capital to Rangoon. After 1852, the Tanintharyi Region consisted the entire southeastern part of Myanmar, including today's Mon State, Kayin State, and Taungoo District, in Bago Region. Mawlamyine was the capital of Tanintharyi.

Upon independence from Britain in 1948, the northeastern districts of Tanintharyi were placed into the newly created Karen State. In 1974, the northern part of remaining Tanintharyi was carved out to create Mon State. With Mawlamyine now inside Mon State, the capital of Tanintharyi Region was moved to Dawei.

== Administrative divisions ==
Districts of Tanintharyi Region Dawei District Myeik District Bokepyin District Kawthoung District

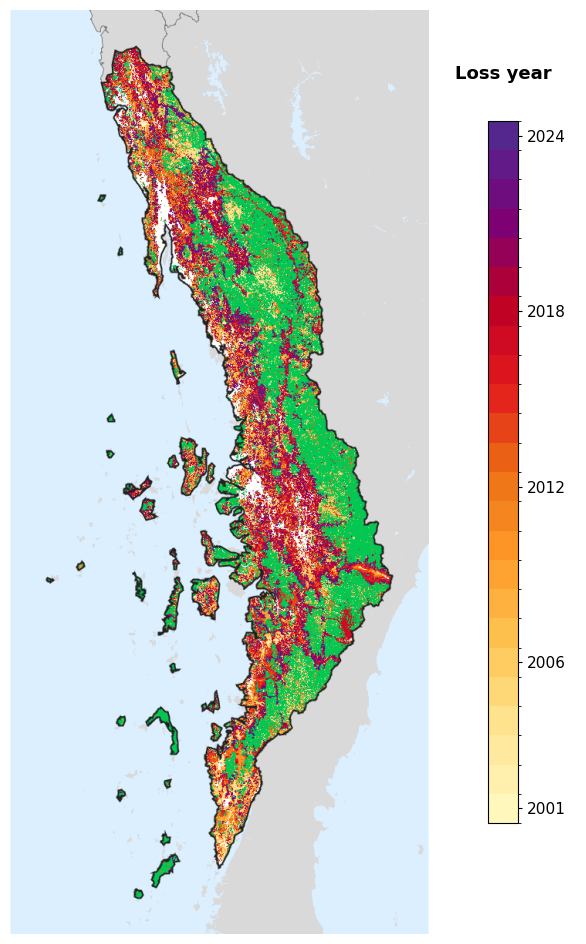
Tree-cover loss year in Tanintharyi Region, 2001-2024, from the Global Forest Change dataset.

Tanintharyi Region comprises ten townships and six subtownships, spreading over four districts:

| Name | List |
|---|---|
| Dawei District | 1. Dawei Township; 2. Launglon Township; 3. Thayetchaung Township; 4. Yebyu Township; 1. Kaleinaung Subtownship; 2. Myitta Subtownship |
| Myeik District | 1. Kyunsu Township; 2. Myeik Township; 3. Palaw Township; 4. Tanintharyi Township; 1. Palauk Subtownship |
| Bokepyin District | 1. Bokpyin Township; 1. Karathuri Subtownship; 2. Pyigyimandaing Subtownship |
| Kawthoung District | 1. Kawthoung Township; 1. Khamaukgyi Subtownship |

== Government ==
=== Executive ===
The Tanintharyi Region Government is the executive body responsible for the governance and administration of Tanintharyi Region. Led by the Chief Minister of Tanintharyi Region, it carries out the duties prescribed to it by law and the 2008 Constitution of Myanmar.

The powers of the Tanintharyi Region Government include:

- Economic Development & Investment: The regional government has the authority to oversee local economic planning and approve localized business ventures through bodies like the Tanintharyi Region Investment Committee (TRIC).
- Local Municipal and Public Utilities: Managing local infrastructure, municipal services, regional town planning, and localized energy distribution.
- Agriculture and Natural Resources: Administering local salt production, local cutting of firewood, local fisheries, and state-sanctioned agricultural projects within Union-defined boundaries.
- Social Affairs & Relief: Executing regional public health initiatives, local sports, and providing immediate emergency relief supplies (such as flood and landslide aid) within regional townships.

The region government has also committed to humanitarian aid and disaster relief such as managing local civic programs and emergency response by providing flood and landslide relief supplies to affected households across Dawei, Launglon, Thayetchaung, and Tanintharyi townships.

=== Legislature ===
The Tanintharyi Region Hluttaw is the unicameral legislature of the region. With 28 seats, it is led by the Speaker. The latest elections for the legislature was the 2025-26 Myanmar general election.

The legislature's powers are prescribed in Schedule Two - Region or State Legislative List of the 2008 Constitution of Myanmar and include:

- Finance and Planning Sector
- Economic Sector
- Agriculture and Livestock Breeding Sector
- Energy, Electricity, Mining and Forestry Sector
- Industrial Sector
- Transport, Communication and Construction Sector
- Social Sector
- Management Sector

=== Judiciary ===
Tanintharyi Region High Court is the region's highest-level court.

== Transport ==
Trains run on the Tanintharyi line between Yangon and Dawei. A deepwater port is planned in Dawei, a project that includes a highway and a railway line between Bangkok and that harbour.

The Maw Daung pass international cross-border checkpoint into Thailand has been developed since 2014.

== Demographics ==
Historical population
| Year | Pop. | ±% |
|---|---|---|
| 1973 | 719,441 | — |
| 1983 | 917,247 | +27.5% |
| 2014 | 1,408,401 | +53.5% |
Source: 2014 Myanmar Census

In 2014, the region had a population of 1.4 million people. The region is home to Dawei people (also called Tavoyans), who form a subgroup of the Bamar people. The Dawei speak the Tavoyan dialect, a variety of Burmese with profound pronunciation and vocabulary differences from standard Burmese.

=== Ethnic makeup ===
Ethnic composition of Tanintharyi Region
| Ethnic group | Percentage |
| Bamar | 86.5% |
| Karen | 7.5% |
| Other | 4.2% |
| Mon | 1.8% |
Source: 2019 GAD township reports

The Bamar — chiefly the Dawei and Bamar migrants — make up the majority of the region's population. The Karen comprise the region's largest minority. Other groups, such as Mons, Burmese Thai, Myeik, Burmese Malays, and Mokens, form small minorities. Nonetheless, numerous Burmese Thais are individuals without citizenship.

After the 2014 Census in Myanmar, the Burmese government indefinitely withheld release of detailed ethnicity data, citing concerns around political and social concerns surrounding the issue of ethnicity in Myanmar. In 2022, researchers published an analysis of the General Administration Department's nationwide 2018–2019 township reports to tabulate the ethnic makeup of the region.

=== Religion ===
Religion in Tanintharyi (2014)
1. Buddhism (87.5%)
2. Christianity (7.20%)
3. Islam (5.10%)
4. Hindu (0.20%)

According to the 2014 Myanmar Census, Buddhists make up 87.5% of Tanintharyi Region's population, forming the largest religious community there. Minority religious communities include Christians (7.2%), Muslims (5.1%), and Hindus (0.2%) who collectively comprise the remainder of Tanintharyi Region's population. 0.1% of the population listed no religion, other religions, or were otherwise not enumerated.

According to the State Sangha Maha Nayaka Committee's 2016 statistics, 9095 Buddhist monks were registered in Tanintharyi Region, comprising 1.7% of Myanmar's total Sangha membership, which includes both novice samanera and fully-ordained bhikkhu. The majority of monks belong to the Thudhamma Nikaya (83.8%), followed by Shwegyin Nikaya (1.1%), with the remainder of monks belonging to other small monastic orders. 978 thilashin were registered in Tanintharyi Region, comprising 1.6% of Myanmar's total thilashin community.

== Economy ==
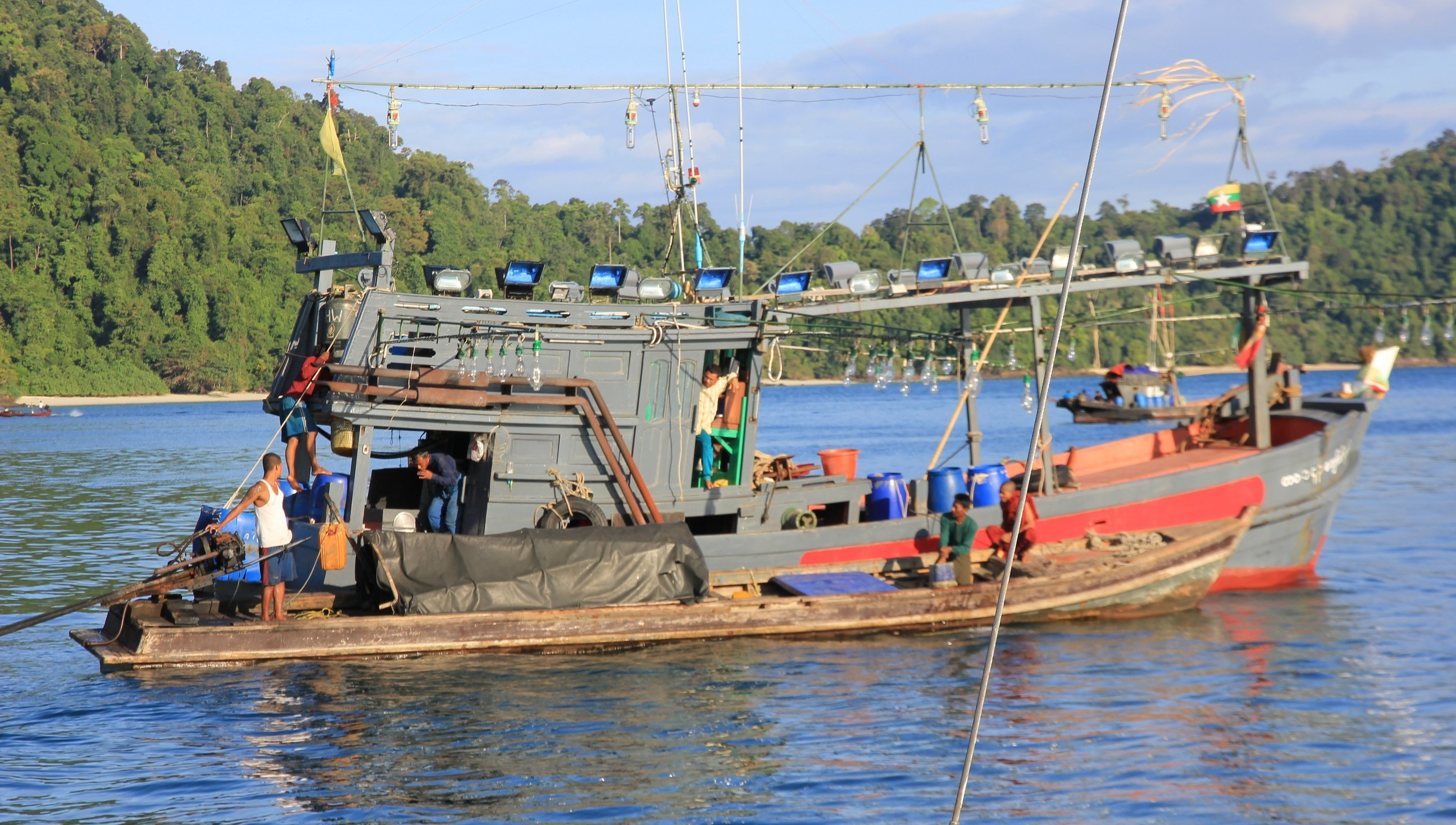
A fishing boat in the Mergui Archipelago

Due to its proximity to the Indian Ocean, seafood products, including dried fish, dried shrimp and ngapi (shrimp paste), are a major part of its economy, for both domestic consumption and export to Thailand. Bird's nests are also gathered from offshore islands.

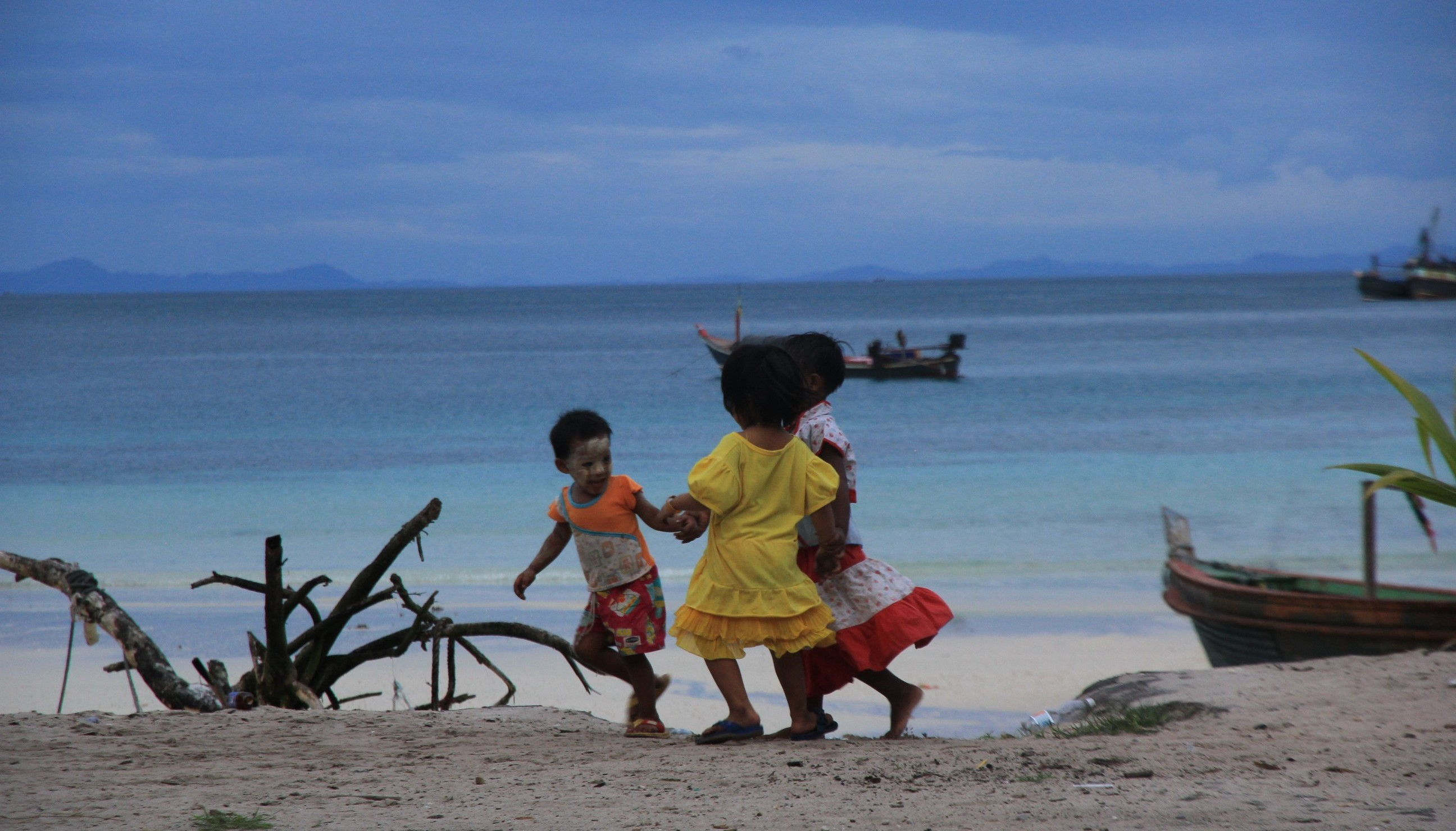
Children play on an island in the Mergui Archipelago

The region is also home to several metal mines, including Heinda, Hamyingyi, Kanbauk, Yawa, Kyaukmetaung, Nanthida and Yadanabon. Pearls are also cultured on Pearl Island.

In recent years, large-scale palm oil and rubber tree plantations have been established in the region.

=== Palm oil ===
Beginning in the 1970s, smaller-scale palm oil plantations were developed in the region. In 1999, the ruling military junta, the State Peace and Development Council, initiated the large-scale development of such plantations in the region. As of 2019, the government has awarded over 401,814 ha of palm oil concessions in Tanintharyi to 44 companies. 60% of the awarded concessions consist of forests and native vegetation, and some concessions overlap with national parks, including Tanintharyi and Lenya National Parks, which have seen deforestation and threaten conservation efforts for endemic species like the Indochinese tiger.

One major concession in the region, the Myanmar Stark Prestige Plantation, became the subject of an ASEAN Parliamentarians for Human Rights investigation, after local NGOs published a report that documented labour and land rights violations in 19 Karen villages. The controversial plantation is jointly owned by Malaysia-based Prestige Platform and Stark Industries, owned by Mya Thidar Sway Tin, a Burmese businesswoman.

== Education ==
Educational opportunities in Myanmar are extremely limited outside the main cities of Yangon and Mandalay. According to official statistics, less than 10% of primary school students in the region continue to high school.

| AY 2002-2003 | Primary | Middle | High |
|---|---|---|---|
| Schools | 1011 | 59 | 30 |
| Teachers | 3000 | 1300 | 400 |
| Students | 170,000 | 54,000 | 14,000 |

All of Tanintharyi's seven universities and colleges are located in Dawei and Myeik. Until recently, Dawei University was the only four-year university in the region. See also List of Universities in Tanintharyi Region.

== Health care ==
The general state of health care in Myanmar is poor. The government spends anywhere from 0.5% to 3% of the country's GDP on health care, consistently ranking among the lowest in the world. Although health care is nominally free, in reality, patients have to pay for medicine and treatment, even in public clinics and hospitals. Public hospitals lack many of the basic facilities and equipment. Moreover, the health care infrastructure outside of Yangon and Mandalay is extremely poor. In 2003, the entire Tanintharyi Region had fewer hospital beds than the Yangon General Hospital. The following is a summary of the public health care system.

| 2002–2003 | # Hospitals | # Beds |
|---|---|---|
| Specialist hospitals | 0 | 0 |
| General hospitals with specialist services | 2 | 400 |
| General hospitals | 10 | 346 |
| Health clinics | 14 | 224 |
| Total | 26 | 970 |
