= Kawthaung =

Kawthaung ကော့သောင်းမြို့ (Burmese) ကအ်သံၚ် (Mon) Kawthoung
- Town
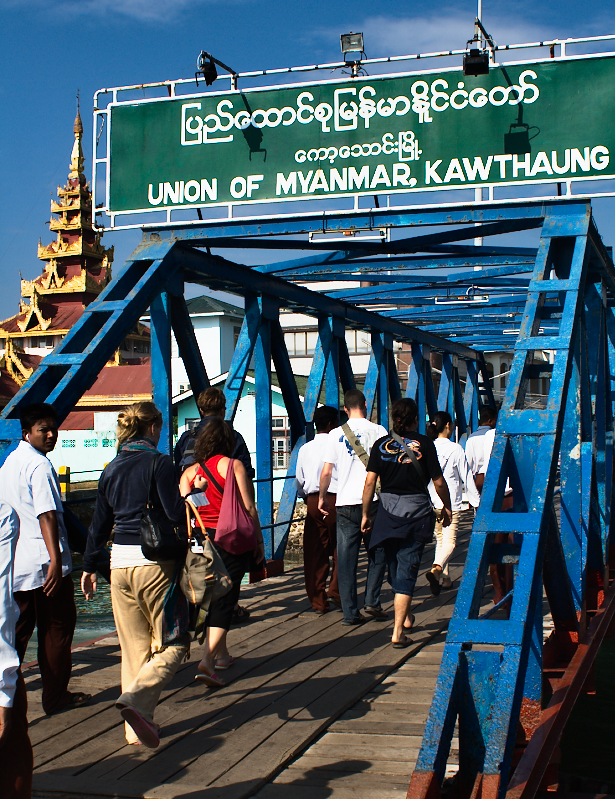
- Border crossing at Kawthaung

- Location in Myanmar (Burma)
- Coordinates: 9°59′N 98°33′E
- Country: Myanmar
- Region: Tanintharyi Region
- District: Kawthaung
- Township: Kawthaung Township

Population (2021)
  - Total: 57,949
- Demonym: Kawthaunggese
- Time zone: UTC+6.30 (MMT)

Kawthaung (Note: Burmese: ကော့သောင်း, MLCTS: kau. saung:, pronounced [kɔ̰θáʊ̯ɰ̃]; Mon: ကအ်ပိ, ကအ်သံၚ်; Thai: เกาะสอง; RTGS: Ko Song, pronounced [kɔ̀ʔ sɔ̌ːŋ]; Malay: Pulau Dua, ڤولاو دوا) is a border town located in the southernmost part of Myanmar, in the Tanintharyi Region. During British rule in Burma between 1824 and 1948, it was known as Victoria Point. As of 2021, it has a population of 57,949. Facing Ranong in Thailand, Kawthaung is one of seven official border trade posts with Thailand.

== History ==
Rakhine and Tanintharyi were transferred to British rule after the First Anglo-Burmese War of 1823–1826.

In 1859, a local group of Chinese and Thais settled at Maliwan (Thai language) to the north of Kawthaung, a place with numerous lakes and flowering trees. In 1865, an Arab–Malay group led by Nayuda Ahmed, traveling and collecting sea products around Mergui Archipelago started a base and village at the bay of Victoria Point.

In 1872 the third mayor of Mergui District, Sir Ashly Din (1870–1875), assigned the first police officer to be stationed at Maliwan, a village 24 miles north of current Victoria Point. In 1891, the local government offices were moved from Maliwan to Kawthaung because Maliwan is located on the bank of a small shallow river, Maliwan Creek, unsuitable for large ships to enter and waiting tide water.

== Geography ==
Kawthaung is located about 10°N and 98.30°E at the mouth of Kyan River on the Malay Peninsula. To its east is the Thai border town of Ranong. To its west, and south-west, the Andaman Sea opens up to the Indian Ocean and Bokpyin Township is located to the north NH1. Most of the terrain in the area is mountainous.

== Climate ==
Kawthaung has a tropical monsoon climate (Köppen climate classification Am). Temperatures are hot throughout the year. There is a winter dry season (December–March) and a summer wet season (April–November). Torrential rain falls from May to September, with over 500 millimetres (20 in) falling in each month.

Climate data for Kawthaung (1991–2020, extremes 1949-present)
Month	Jan	Feb	Mar	Apr	May	Jun	Jul	Aug	Sep	Oct	Nov	Dec	Year
Record high °C (°F)	36.0 (96.8)	37.0 (98.6)	38.7 (101.7)	39.7 (103.5)	39.5 (103.1)	35.5 (95.9)	35.0 (95.0)	35.7 (96.3)	34.5 (94.1)	34.5 (94.1)	39.5 (103.1)	39.0 (102.2)	39.7 (103.5)
Mean daily maximum °C (°F)	31.7 (89.1)	33.2 (91.8)	34.2 (93.6)	34.3 (93.7)	32.2 (90.0)	30.8 (87.4)	30.2 (86.4)	30.1 (86.2)	29.8 (85.6)	30.2 (86.4)	30.8 (87.4)	30.6 (87.1)	31.5 (88.7)
Daily mean °C (°F)	26.8 (80.2)	27.8 (82.0)	28.7 (83.7)	29.1 (84.4)	27.9 (82.2)	27.0 (80.6)	26.4 (79.5)	26.3 (79.3)	26 (79)	26.1 (79.0)	26.5 (79.7)	26.2 (79.2)	27.1 (80.8)
Mean daily minimum °C (°F)	21.8 (71.2)	22.4 (72.3)	23.3 (73.9)	24.0 (75.2)	23.5 (74.3)	23.2 (73.8)	22.6 (72.7)	22.6 (72.7)	22.2 (72.0)	22.1 (71.8)	22.2 (72.0)	21.8 (71.2)	22.6 (72.7)
Record low °C (°F)	15.0 (59.0)	12.4 (54.3)	14.0 (57.2)	16.7 (62.1)	13.5 (56.3)	17.5 (63.5)	17.5 (63.5)	14.2 (57.6)	16.5 (61.7)	14.6 (58.3)	12.6 (54.7)	15.2 (59.4)	12.4 (54.3)
Average precipitation mm (inches)	33.3 (1.31)	11.3 (0.44)	73.1 (2.88)	128.6 (5.06)	520.8 (20.50)	681.3 (26.82)	765.2 (30.13)	758.9 (29.88)	719.2 (28.31)	461.0 (18.15)	137.1 (5.40)	54.8 (2.16)	4,344.5 (171.04)
Average precipitation days (≥ 1.0 mm)	3.1	1.8	4.4	9.1	21.1	22.5	24.5	24.1	23.9	20.8	11.6	5.8	172.6
Average relative humidity (%)	72	72	72	75	83	87	87	89	88	86	81	76	81
Source 1: World Meteorological Organization
Source 2: Deutscher Wetterdienst (humidity 1951-1967) Meteo Climat (record highs and lows)

== Demographics ==
The majority of Kawthaung's population is made up of Bamar, Thai and other ethnic minorities such as the Shan, Karen, and Mon. Some Thai Muslims, alongside the Salone Sea Gypsies and Malays can also be found in Kawthaung. Burmese Chinese and Burmese Indians, who migrated to Kawthaung during colonial rule for tin mining and other industries also inhabit Kawthaung. Peranakan or Straits Chinese, called Pashu by the Burmese, can also be found in Kawthaung.

The most common spoken language is Burmese, followed by Thai and Southern Thai as well as Shan, Moken, Karen, Mon, Kedah Malay and Chinese and Indian languages..

Most of the Bamar, Thai, Shan, Karen, Mon, Burmese Chinese and some portions of the Salone adhere to Theravada Buddhism. The Malays and Thai Muslims practice Islam.

== Economy and local products ==
The town is home to one of 7 official border trade posts with Thailand, and opened on 1 June 1996. In 2022, total trade volume at the border post stood at US$202.276 million.

The main agriculture products are rubber, betel nut, cashew nut, coconut and oil palm. Mining and wood log industries which flourished in the past have now dried out.

Although Kawthaung has a large port the fishing industry is not as large as in the past because of the government restriction on fishing vessels. Fishing still plays a significant role but engines are restricted to 28 hp. Tourism is bound to play a larger role for the local economy in the future as Myanmar's government is gradually lifting travel and immigration restrictions in the area. Since September 2013, tourists entering the country through Kawthaung are able to continue their journeys on land and exit through any other border crossing.

An 8 megawatt coal-fired power plant was completed in 2012, amid local concerns on pollution issues.

== Immigration and Visa entry ==
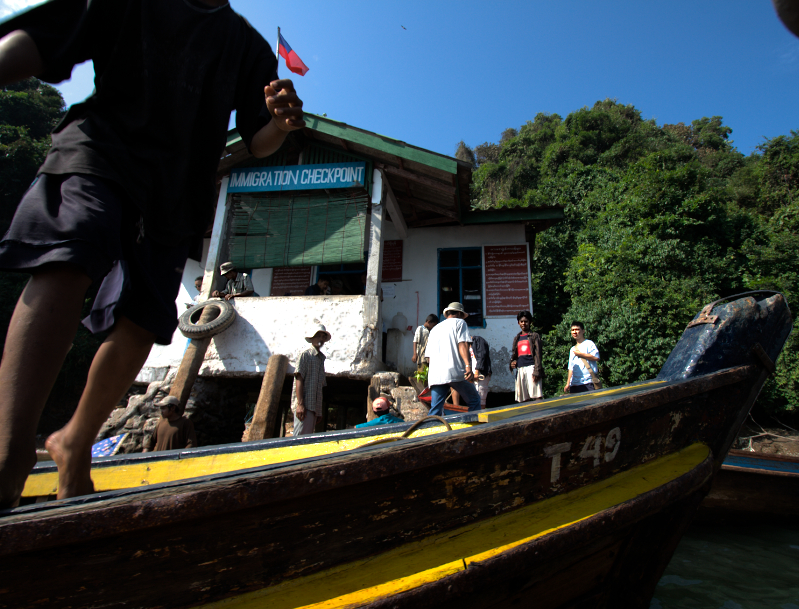
Immigration checkpoint in Kawthaung

Thai people can cross into Myanmar through Kawthaung by applying for a temporary border pass without a visa. When crossing with a Thai passport, a visa must be applied for in advance since the related bilateral agreement between Thailand and Myanmar has exceptions only when arriving through an airport. Other foreigners must have a passport that is valid for at least another 6 months and are required to pay a fee. The border is popular for visa renewal with tourists staying in Phuket, Ko Tao, Ko Pha Ngan and other places in southern Thailand. A three-day (two-night) visa to Myanmar costs $10 USD.

== Photos ==
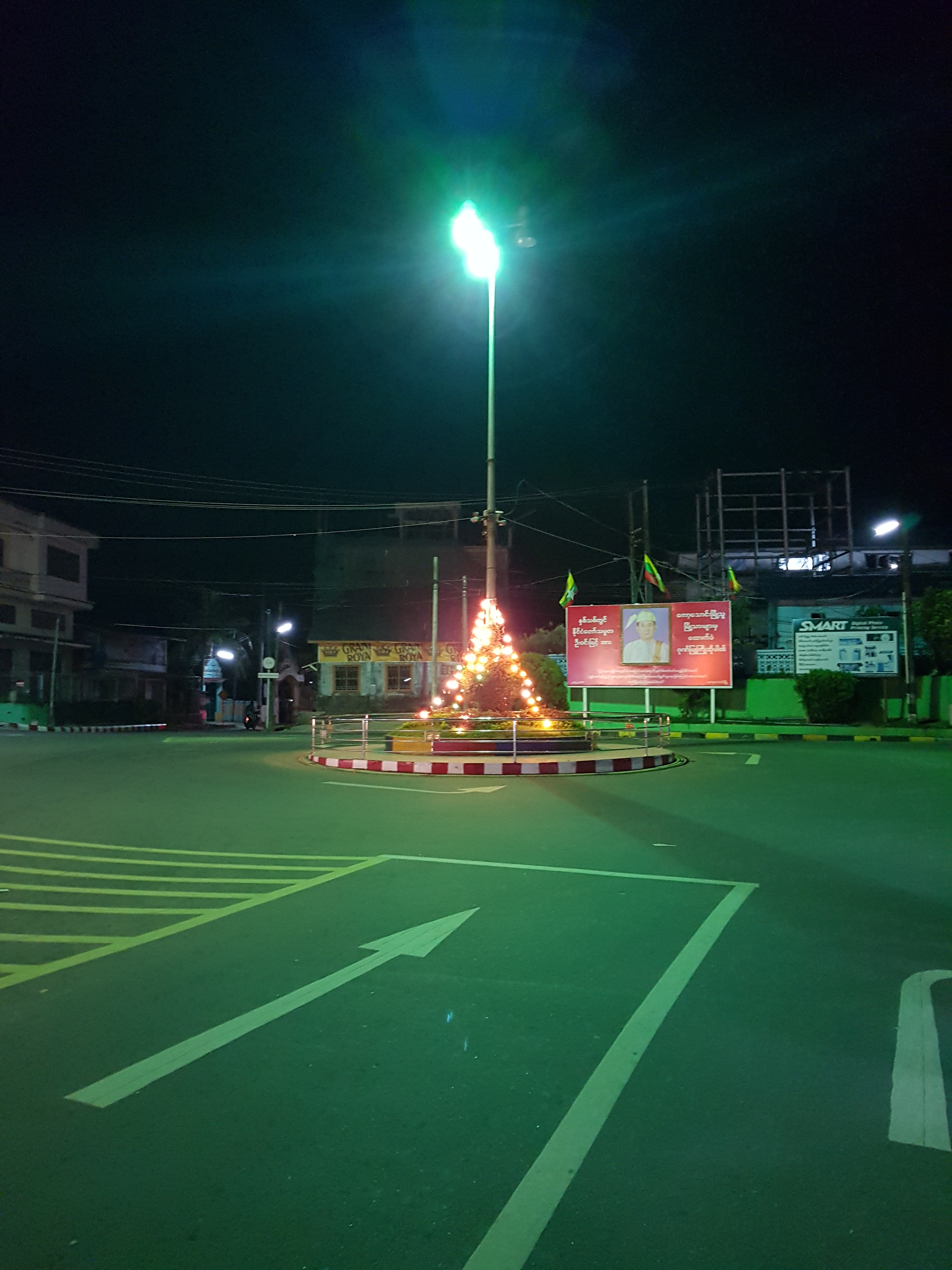
City Circle

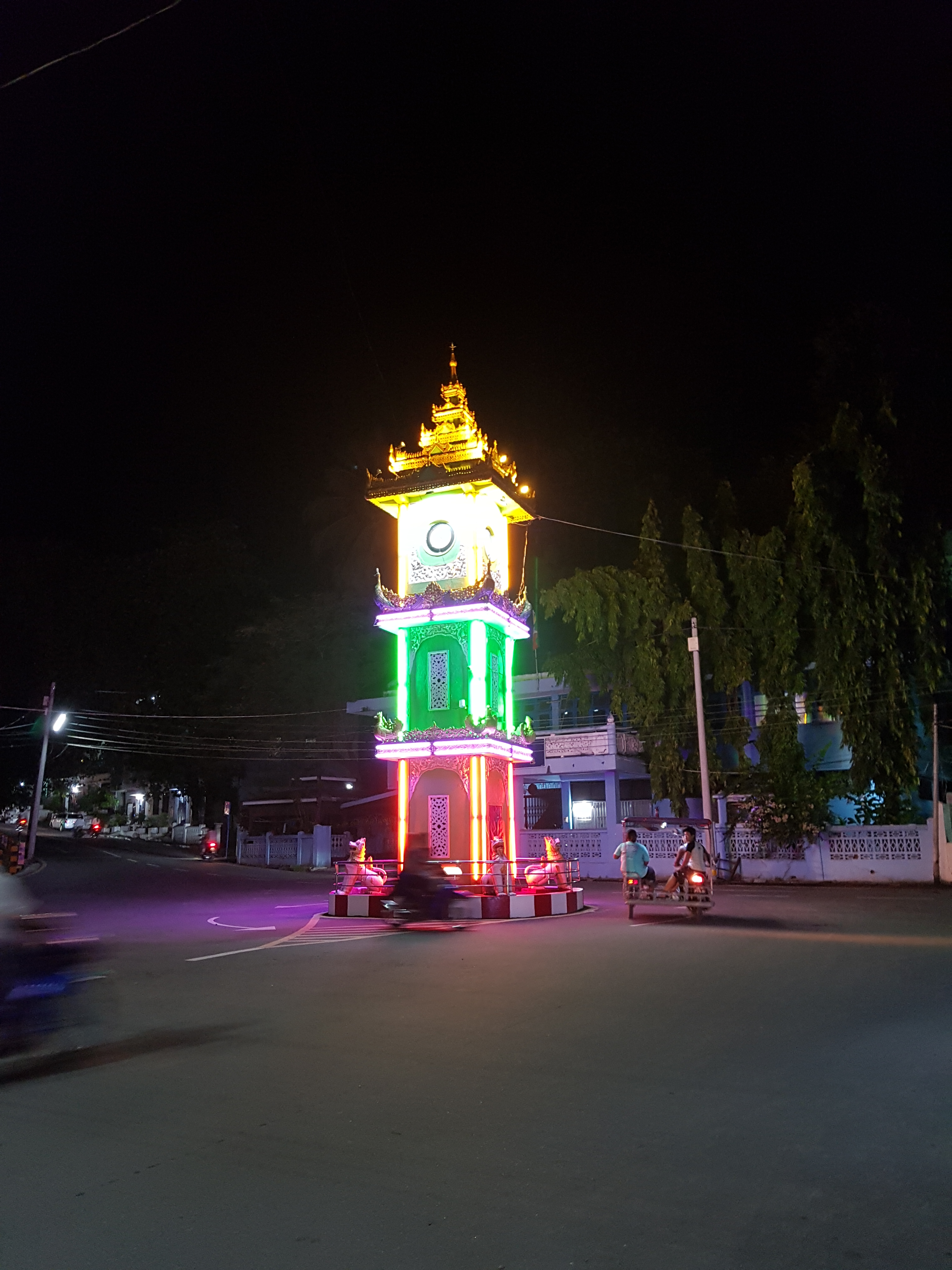
Clock Tower

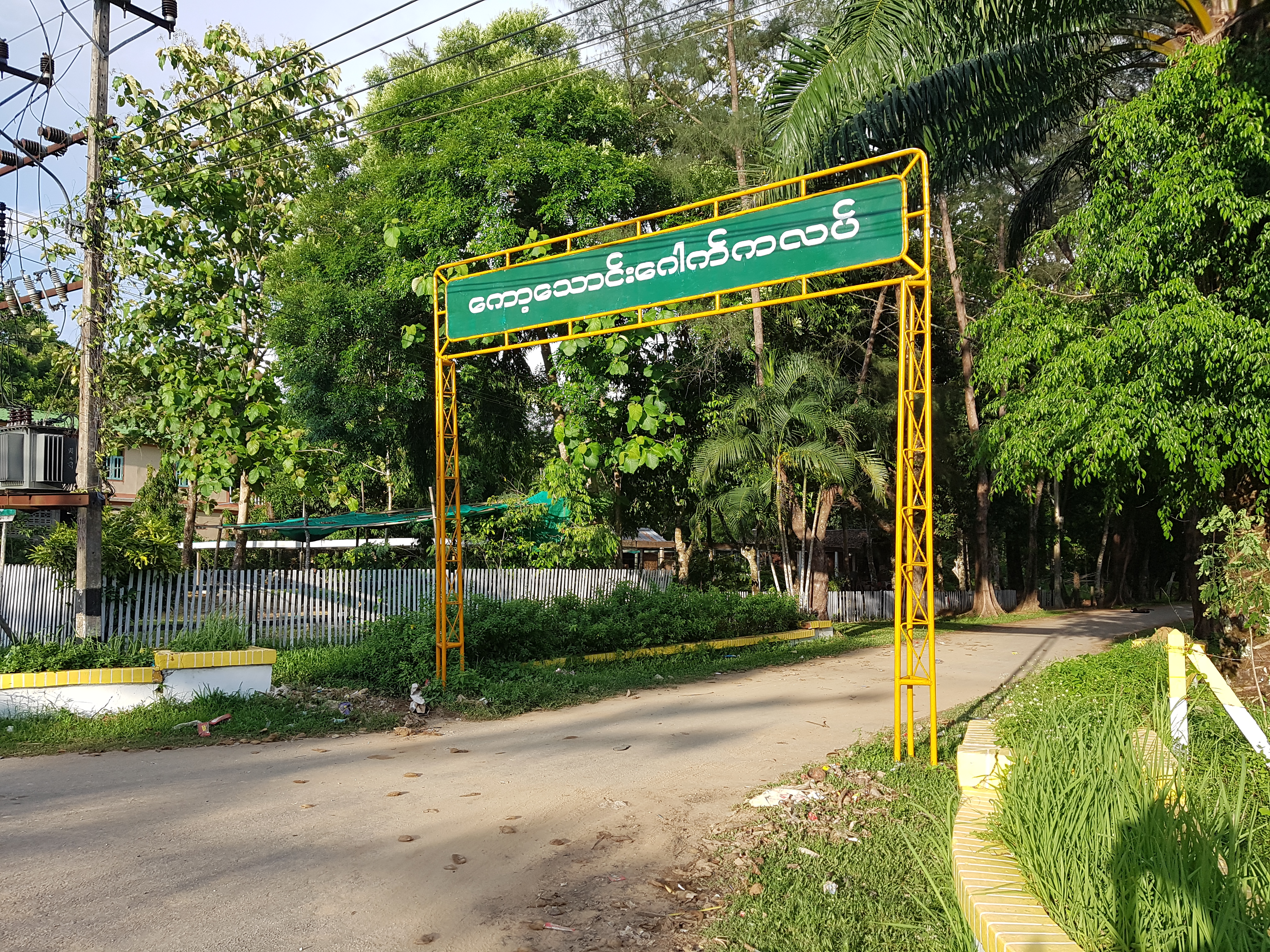
Kawthoung Golf Club Entrance

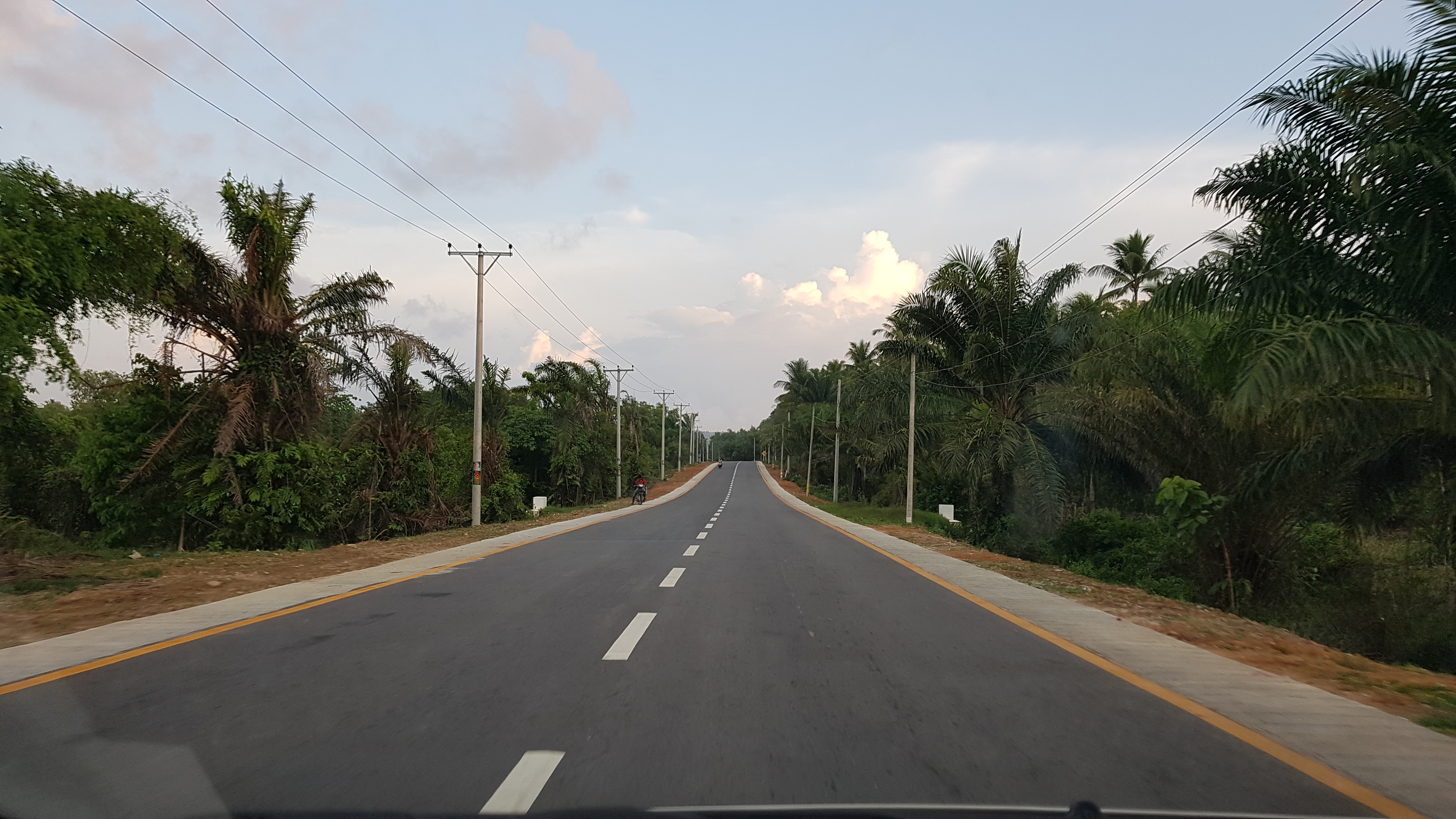
Kawthaung-Bokepyin Road NH1

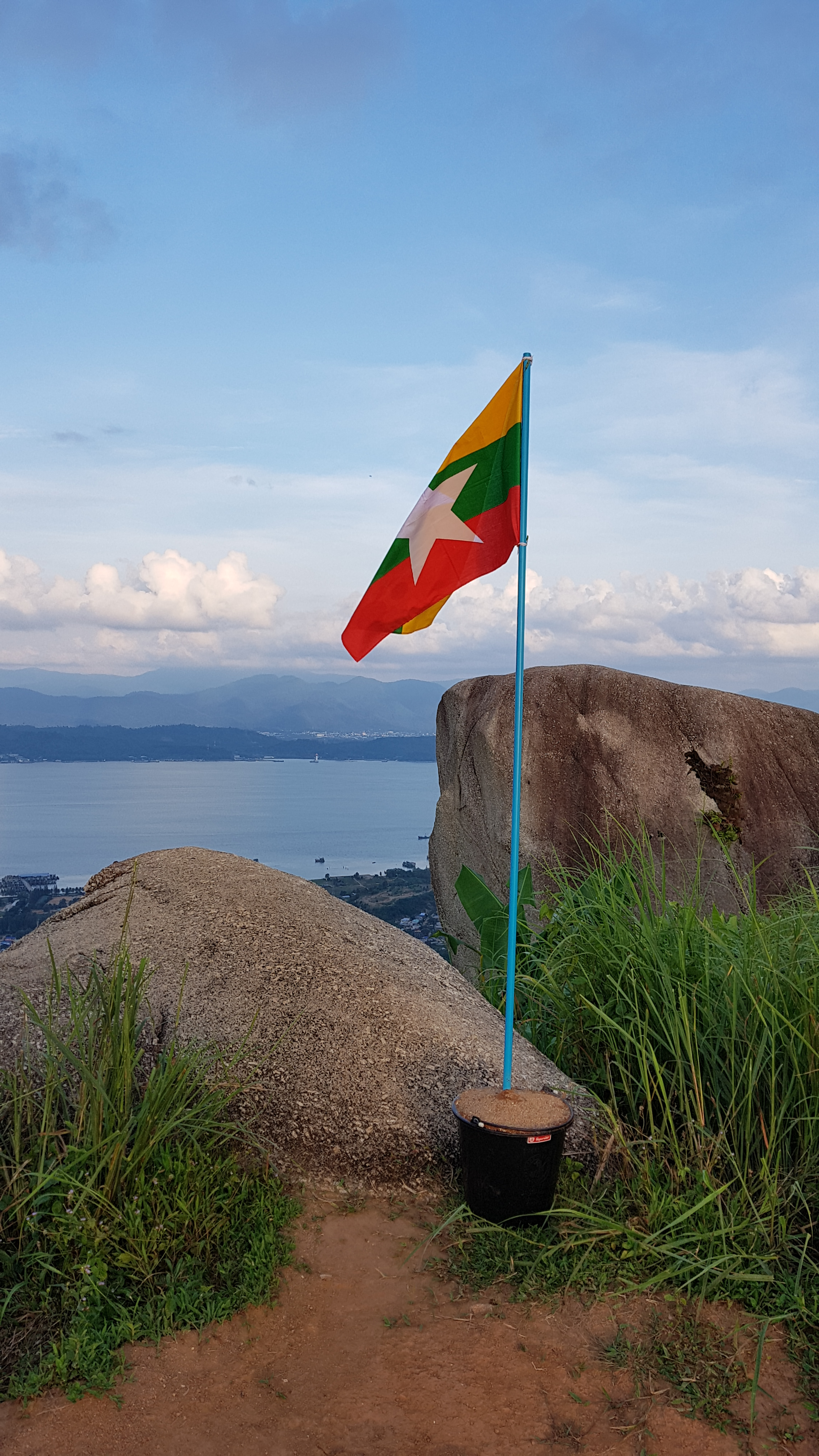
1199 Mountain

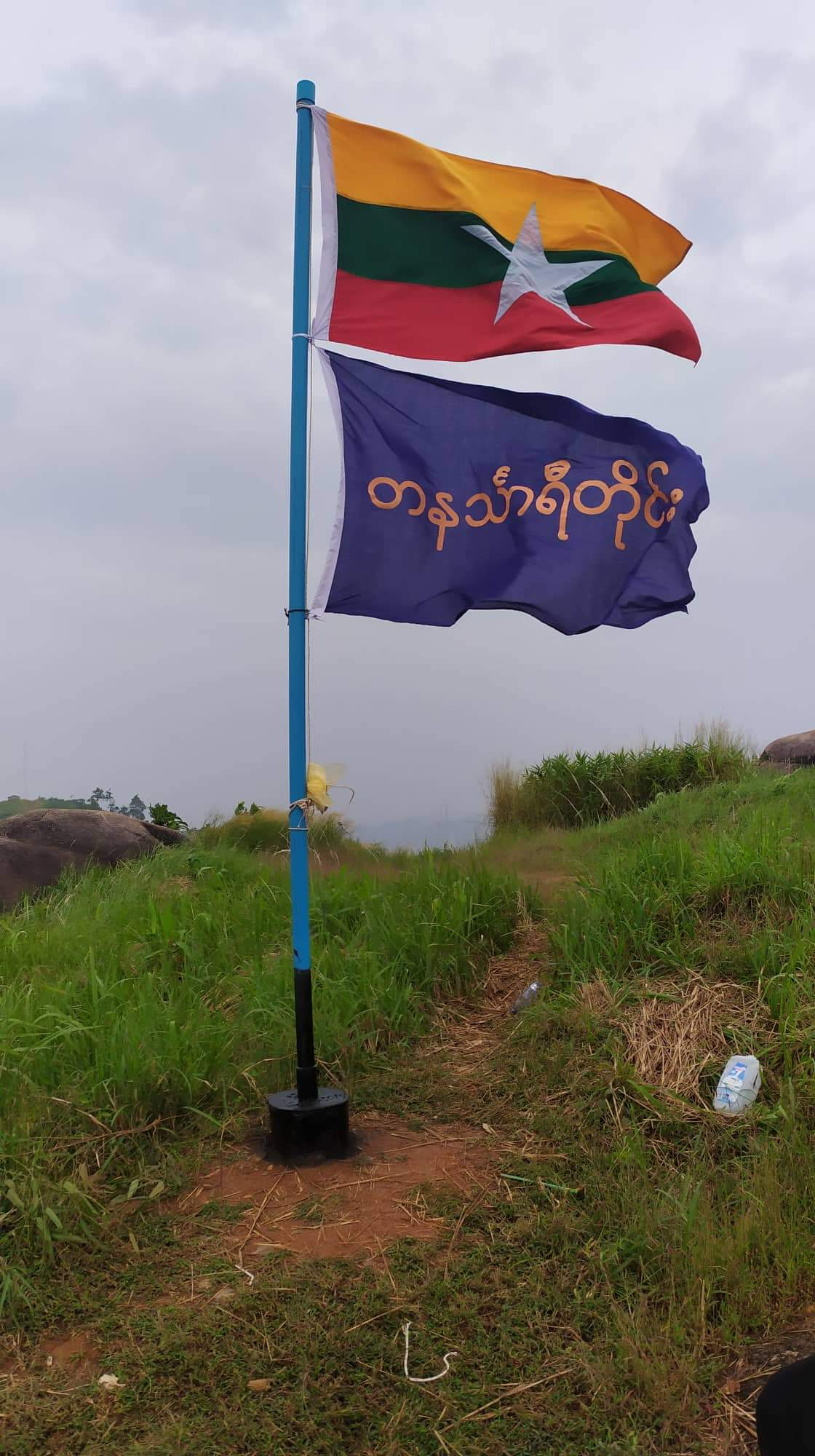
Myanmar and Tanintharyi Region flags raised at 1199 Mountain Peak

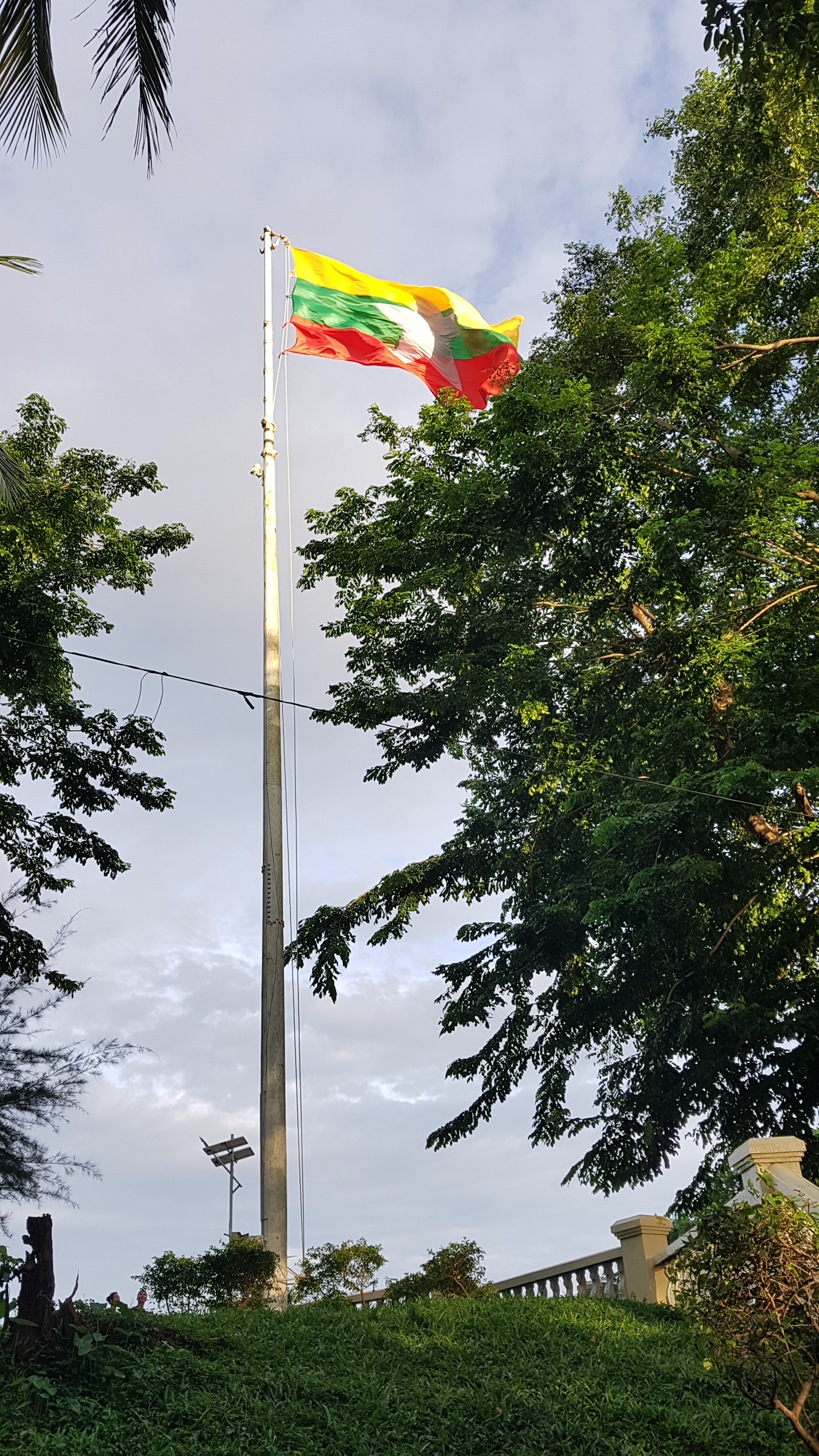
King Byint Naung Land Flagpole

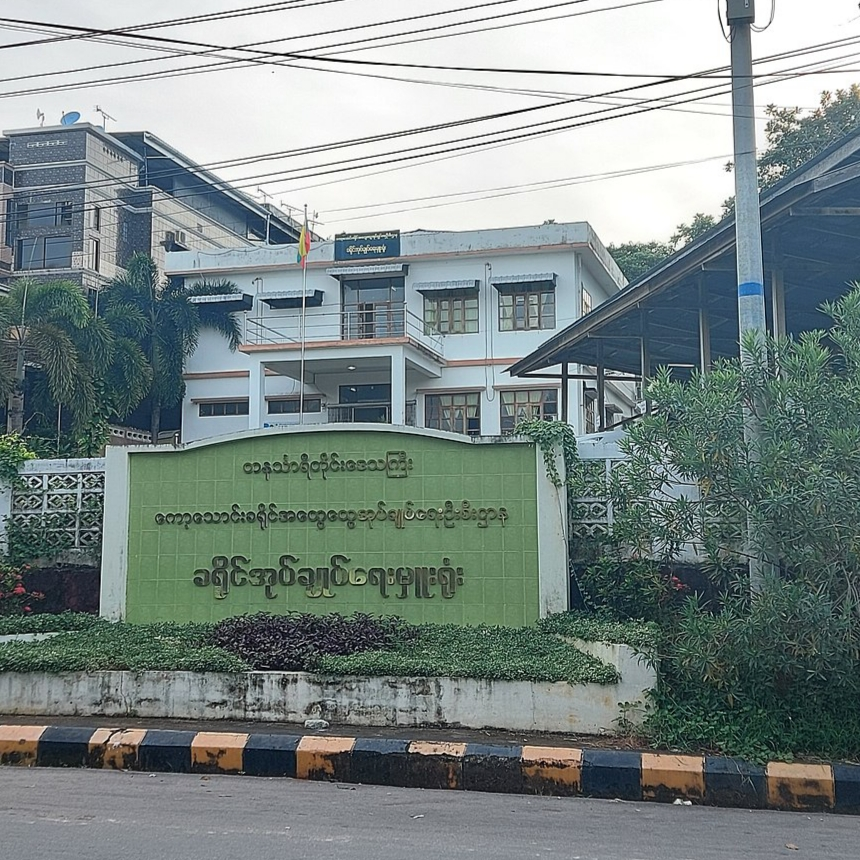
Kawthaung District Administrative Office

== Sister cities ==
- Ranong, Thailand

== See also ==
- Kawthaung Airport
