= Secondary language of ASEAN =

Proposal for the Association of Southeast Asian Nations

Countries where pluricentric Malay is spoken, regardless of standard variety

Article 34 of the ASEAN Charter explicitly designates English as the sole working language of the organization. However, there are some advocacy for the expansion of another language within the region that could work as a secondary language. One prevalent revisited proposal is for the promotion of the Malay language (or its variants) as an official ASEAN lingua-franca. In 2022, Ismail Sabri Yaakob, then Prime Minister of Malaysia, proposed the use of Bahasa Melayu as ASEAN's second language. Ismail Sabri Yaakob said Malaysia and Indonesia will continue to make efforts to uplift the status of Bahasa Melayu, which may become an ASEAN language one day.

The Dewan Bahasa dan Pustaka (DBP) Board of Governors chairman, Dr. Awang Sariyan, remarked that the agreement reached by Malaysia and Indonesia to continue to work together to uplift the status of Bahasa Melayu will increase the chance of it being adopted as an ASEAN and international language, because Bahasa Melayu (which has about 300 million speakers) is also used in Indonesia, Brunei, Singapore, Thailand, the Philippines, Cambodia, Laos, Vietnam, Myanmar and Timor Leste, while efforts to make Bahasa Melayu as the official language of ASEAN required strong support from all Malay-speaking countries.

Map of Malayo-Chamic languages

== Proposal ==
When Vietnam joined ASEAN in the 1990s, there was a brief suggestion to use French (due to Vietnam’s francophone history), but this was set aside in favor of English.

Malay as the secondary language of ASEAN, held historical interest within the political organization. At an ASEAN cultural meeting in Jakarta in 1987, Malaysia and Indonesia once proposed the use of Malay (or Bahasa Indonesia) as the association's language for speeches and diplomacy, although the initiative did not advance further.

=== Ismail Sabri's proposal ===
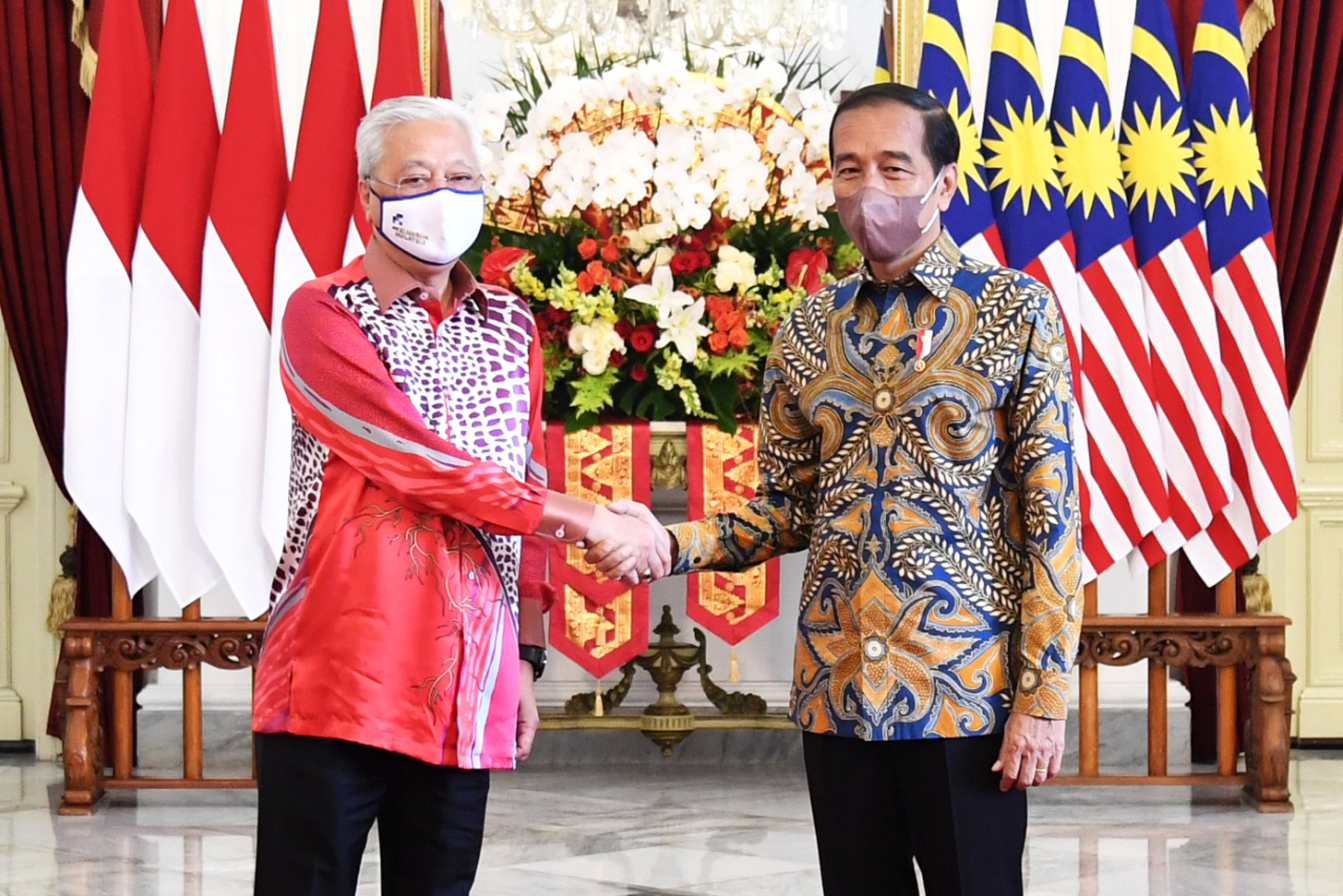
Malaysian Prime Minister, Ismail Sabri, and Indonesian President, Joko Widodo, held rapport to the idea of Malay being ASEAN's proposed second official language.

Upon his prime ministership, the Ismail Sabri cabinet has pushed the promotion of the Malay language as being part of its Foreign Policy Framework, launched in 7 December 2021. On 23 March 2022, in response to questions in the Dewan Negara regarding efforts to promote the national language internationally, Prime Minister Ismail Sabri Yaakob announced that Malaysia would propose the adoption of Malay as ASEAN's second official language. He argued that the widespread presence of Malay speakers across Southeast Asia supported its adoption as one of ASEAN's official languages. Ismail Sabri expressed interest in the idea after learning during a state visit to Cambodia that approximately 800,000 Malay-Cham people in the country spoke Malay, while in Vietnam an estimated 160,000 individuals of Malay-Cham ancestry were also Malay speakers. The idea was reinforced by the fact that Malay was already in use in Indonesia, Brunei, Singapore, Southern Thailand, Southern Philippines, and parts of Cambodia. Ismail Sabri would later speak and propose the idea to Malaysia's Dewan Negara (Senate), giving the same reasons.

Malaysia first pursued diplomatic support for the proposal, with Ismail Sabri raising the issue during bilateral meetings. Notably, on April 1, 2022, he held talks with Indonesian President Joko Widodo in Jakarta. Ismail Sabri had brought the proposal to president Jokowi to support to the initiative. In a joint press statement, the two leaders agreed to work together to strengthen the Malay language, referring to it broadly as a regional language encompassing namely Malaysian Malay, Indonesian, Brunei Malay, Southern Thai Malay (Kelantan–Pattani Malay & Kedah Malay), Champa Malay in Cambodia and Vietnam, Malay in the Philippines, and Malay in Singapore, Burmese Malays, and other Malay variants.

== Dialect question ==
By April 4, 2022, Nadiem Anwar Makarim, then Minister of Education, Culture, Research, and Technology of Indonesia, remarked that he rejected the suggestion to strengthen Malay language as the ASEAN official language and intermediary language, [and suggested] the aspiration should be reviewed and discussed further at the regional level. Previously, Nadiem Makarim had also proposed a similar proposal back in 2020 for the promotion of Indonesian being Southeast Asia's lingua franca. He argued it would be more feasible to consider Bahasa Indonesia as an ASEAN language given its larger number of speakers and its historical and linguistic standing, pointing out that Bahasa Indonesia is spoken by at least 275 million people, spoken across 47 countries in the world and taught in a number of well-known universities and 428 institutions worldwide, with its adoption as a working language in East Timor. By contrast, he implied, "Malay" as defined by Malaysia is limited in scope and opted a stance of Bahasa Indonesia being a better option than Malay, given Indonesia’s demographic weight and the global recognition of Indonesian as a distinct language.

Indonesian officials delivered mixed messages: while President Jokowi had been diplomatic, officials in Jakarta made it clear they did not uniformly embrace the Malay language proposal. Indonesia’s Foreign Minister Retno Marsudi took a cautious line, saying in April that Malaysia’s idea should be discussed further with ASEAN members before any decision. An official from Indonesia’s Agency for Language Development and Cultivation remarked that Malay as used in Malaysia is not a national language in Indonesia, as it exists only in some border districts. Meanwhile the debacle caused much debate between Malay-Indonesian netizens. Speculation was rife that Jakarta would not welcome Malaysia’s move, precisely because Indonesia’s population and linguistic reach are far greater (Indonesia’s 279 million people far outnumber Malaysians). Noting under the view of the Indonesian language as a distinct and modern evolution of the Malay language, established within the 1928 Youth Pledge. Whilst in the Malaysian view, Indonesian was seen as a "dialect" of the root Malay language.

Amidst its rejection by an Indonesian minister, Malaysia sought to clarify the nature of its proposal to assuage concerns. In May 2022, at an International Symposium on Bahasa Melayu, Ismail Sabri stressed that Malaysia was advocating "Bahasa Melayu" (the Malay language) in general – not specifically "Malaysian Malay" (the Malaysian national idiom). By using the broader term, Ismail Sabri reemphasized that the Malay language transcends national borders, encompassing the standard language used in Brunei and Indonesia as well. Noting that the distinction being that Malaysia was not asking neighbors to adopt the Malaysian-standard Malay per se, but rather to recognize the Malay lingua franca that historically and culturally links many communities in the region. Despite this clarification, no formal action was taken at the ASEAN level in 2022. Changing or adding to this would require agreement from all member states, a high bar that, as subsequent reactions showed, was not met. By late 2022, Malaysia underwent a change in government as Ismail Sabri left office in November 2022, and the initiative to promote Malay at ASEAN largely receded.

== Controversy ==
Kornelius Purba, the editor of The Jakarta Post, commented that the Malaysian leader wanted to leave a quick legacy, the Minister Nadiem Makarim was blunter in rejecting idea, and could spark unnecessary suspicion from predominantly Buddhist nations such as Thailand, Vietnam, Cambodia, Laos, and Myanmar, or from the predominantly Catholic Philippines.

Joanne Lin, a researcher in ISEAS-Yusof Ishak Institute, lamented that this idea will likely be viewed as another nationalistic endeavor by Kuala Lumpur or even Ismail Sabri himself to score points on the domestic front, but possibly erode efforts to preserve regional stability and order, and might open the way for a proliferation of similar requests to pour through the floodgates. Rohiman Haroon commented that the use of Malay language in archipelago will continue to grow and, whether the Indonesians like it or not, the language is a deeply rooted Bahasa Melayu. The case against the proposal are Malay is not widely spoken as claimed as Bahasa Indonesia (Indonesian) is the 10th most spoken language in the world, and not Bahasa Melayu, which could be a case of cultural appropriation. Some states, thus, might interpret the move as a form of political and cultural dominance. As Mandarin Chinese is currently more widely spoken and recognized at the global stage, ASEAN member states may also perceive this as a divisive agenda, and will question why their respective language cannot be the second language. Furthermore, concerns over additional operational cost to be incurred such as for translators and interpreters.

== See also ==
- Chamic languages
- Malayic languages
  - Malay language
- Malay trade and creole languages
- Malay Archipelago
