= List of mosques in Mandalay =

The following is a list providing an overview of mosques in Mandalay with key information regarding them.

== Aung Mye Tharzan Township ==
S/N	Mosque	Images	Situation	Donor	Quarters	Built	Comment/present administrator
1	Miba zay (Parent\'s market)		Amara Tharni	Trader U Phalu	23	1863	Descendants
2	Nwar Chan Kone		Amara Tharni	Royal Milk supplier U Kyar Ko Nyi	36	1863	School
3	Ywar Thar		Daw Na Phwar	Akbart Calvery Officer U Chone	53	1863	Elected executive members
4	Nan Shea\'		Anheit Taw	Madaras Merchant Sema	3	1863	Elected executive members
5	Wali Khan		Maha Zeyabon	Naymyo Gonayap Khan Sab	796	1857/1878	Descendants
6	Shwe Pannet (Golden foundation)		Nandwin (Palace compound)	King Mindon\'s donation	Mingala	1858	Near the present Independence monument. Demolished
7	Ko Yandaw (Royal security)		Nandwin	Religious Dept.	Military	1803	Ar Lawi
8	Inside Jail		Nandwin	Governor General	Jail	1939	Mandalay Jail
9	Kyauk Masjid		Pyigyi Kyet Thayae	Diamond Merchant Ma Cho	162	1858	Elected executive members
10	Tha Htay Dan		Pyigyi Kyet Thayae	Richman U Maung Gyi	173	1858	Descendants
11	Sit Kaing Dan		Pyigyi Kyet Thayae	Royal Purchasing Officer U Mya Hnin	171	1858	Elected executive members
12	Mingala		Pyigyi Kyet Thayae	Trader U Shwe Oo, U Hmut	171	1858	Descendants of U swe Pwint U Tun
13	Surti Jamei\'		Pyigyi Kyet Thayae	Mulla Ismail	180	?1850	Elected executive members
14	Aye Chaint		Pyigyi Kyet Thayae	Merchant U Shwe Oh	116	?1850	Damaged in 1942
15	U Shwe Taung		Thiri Malar	U Shwe Taung & sister Ma Ma Ywe\'	206	1863	Demolished
16	Waheidiar		Thiri Malar	Merchant U Saw	210	1863	Demolished
17	Sate Pateesu		Thiri Malar	Khalifa U Maung Maung	211	1863	Demolished
18	Alae\' Baung		Thiri Malar	Sekyar U Rashid Daw halima	216	1863	Descendants
19	Hninsee Chan		Pyigyi Yanlon	Fire brigade Captain Hninsee	63	1863	Elected executive members
20	Hindustani		Pale Ngwe Yong	Merchant Amarnat	154	1909	Elected executive members

== Chan Aye Tharzan Township ==
S/N	Mosque	Images	Situation	Donor	Quarters	Built	Comment/present administrator
1	Kinta Kala Pyo		Yan Myo Lone	Byae Tike Thandawsint U Boo	751	1858	Near previous Mingalar tagar
2	Kinta Kala Pyo		Yan Myo Lone	Comrade/Thwe Thauk U Pho Naing	572	1863	Descendants
3	Ta Pae (Kat Kye Tan)		Mawra Giwar	Ta Pae Mayor U Pho Yit	712		U Pho Thar-Daw Hmyin
4	East Kone Yoe		Haymar Zala	Royal Nandawin Gardener U Pho & brothers	609	1863	1885-shifted
5	Sekyar Kasimeer		Mawra Giwar	Mingla Cannoncrew Captain U Hnit	680	1863	U Kyi/Daw Khet and others
6	Sekyar (South)		Mawra Giwar	Royal Captain Hashim	680	1863	Hj Abd. Hamid
7	Falan Bo		Mawra Giwar	Royal Cannoncrew Commander U Yar Baw	681	1863	U Win Hj U Ba Toke and others
8	East Achote (South)		Aung Nan East	U Pho Thwe son of Khalifa U Hmwa	553	1863	Elected executive members
9	East Achote (North)		Aung Nan East	Trader U Phoya, Daw Cho & Daw Yu	553	1863	Elected executive members
10	Koyandaw (South)		Aung Nan East	Tat Hmulay Maung Maung Hlaing & Daw Mi Mi Lay	559	1863	U Par Daw Thae
11	Koyandaw (North)		Aung Nan East	Tat Hmulay Maung Maung Hlaing & Daw Mi Mi Lay	559	1863	Damaged in 1942
12	Malon Mosque		Kyae Khatwin(N)	Richman U shwe Bay	558	1863	Damaged in 1942
13	Taung Baloo		Aung Nan	Poet U Nu and others	579	1863	Descendants
14	Oh Daw		Chan Aye Thar Zan	KT U Pho Thet	593	1875	Rebuilt in 1942
15	South Oh Bo		Chan Aye Thar Zan	Hj U Yusof Daw Bii	592	1875	Rebuilt in 1942
16	Yanadabon Oh Bo		Chan Aye Thar Zan	Head of Royal Traders U Min Chain	592	1863	Hj U Myit
17	South Sin Kyone		Chan Aye Thar Zan	U San Pyaw & Indian Council U Dun	591	1863	Descendants
18	North Sin Kyone		Chan Aye Thar Zan	U San Thee	598	1863	Elected executive members
19	Shia Mosque		Chan Aye Thar Zan	Royal Custom Officer Bakar Ali	597	1863	Elected executive members
20	Amyoke Tan Lay		Chan Aye Thar Zan	Min Ye Yan Nain U Da Naing	597	1863	Hj U Sein & Hj Daw May
21	June\'		Chan Aye Thar Zan	King Mindon\'s Royal Servant U Toe	596	1863	Elected executive members
22	Baho (= Central)		Chan Aye Thar Zan	Nandawin U Phothar\'s grandsons	615	1863	Relocate in 1885
23	Tike Tan		Chan Aye Thar Zan	Merchant U Cho Daw Thawt U Ebrahim & Bros	603	1865	Renovated by U Ohn Maung
24	Saing Dan		Thiri Haemar East	Ruby U Nyein	242	1863	0
25	Daun Yoe		Thiri Haemar East	(Royal Saw mill) U Yoe & U phaw Oo	249	1863	Hj Than Than
26	Achote (West)		Aung Nan West	Silk Merchant U Mya & Daw Pu	552	1919	Hj U Kyaw Thein, Sister Hj Daw Khin May
27	Yanadabon Achote		Aung Nan West	Maung Maung Hlaing & Daw Htay	552	1863	Descendants
28	Dae Wun Yadanabon		Dae Wun	Hj U Pho Myit	325	1875	Previous Ship shaped Island
29	Wore Su Mosque		Wore Su	Bengali sailors	326	1919	Damaged
30	Htin Win Mosque		Htin Win	River Transport Department	321	1918	Damaged
31	Zarweiyar		Chan Aye Thar Zan	Khalifa U San Yar	585	1863	Attasia Administers

== Maha Aung Myae Township ==
S/N	Mosque	Images	Situation	Donor	Quarters	Built	Comment/present administrator
1	Sein Pan Benali Masjid		Sein Pan	Ship owner Chaudery	331	1905	Descendants
2	Ywar Haing		Dae Wun East	U Pho Ya	283	1908	Damaged
3	Wor Chan		Koon Chan	Royal maid Daw Nan Yeik	537	1863	U Sae/Daw Yi/bombed
4	Yap Htan		Koon Chan	Silfk Merchant U Pe/U Ba Din	538	1863	Descendants
5	Hlwa Htaung		Hlwa Htaung	Silfk Merchant U Ban/U Ba Win	544	1863	Elected executive members
6	Than Lan		Than Lan	U Pho/Daw Yit	544	1863	Mayor U Tokekalay
7	Mya Kone Paw		U Kyar Gyi	Royal Security Capt San Tun	545	1863	Elected executive members
8	Panthay		Kinsanahahi	Yunnan Sultan Sulayman	549	1868	Descendants
9	Anouk (west) Pali (Masjid)		Sekyar Nwezin	Broker U Khin and others	678	1885	Elected executive members
10	Bone Oh		Sekyar Nwezin	Royal Captain U Kyae	678	1863	
11	Mingala Alae (central)		Sekyar Nwezin	Royal Captain U Yawk	677	1863	
12	Sulae		Sekyar Nwezin	Royal Captain U Maung	674	1863	
13	Letpan		Sekyar Nwezin	Comrade/Thwe Thauk U Pyawn	684	1863	
14	Islamic Centre		Mandalay University	Students and Mandalayans	619	1915	Lecturers & Students
15	Shwe Phone Shein		Phayagyi	Kamman Captain U Shwe Oh et al.	829	1785	Hj U Ba Khin and et al.
16	PanSet		Than Hlet Maw	Hj Daw Phwar		1863	Elected executive members
17	Eidgar		Than Hlet Maw	Sunnat Jamaat		1920	Land & Pond present
18	Sittang		Mye Par Yat Army Camp	Municipal		1918	Foundation only left

== Early Masjids in Mandalay, Pyigyi Tagun Township, period of Amarapura ==
Approved by the Burmese Kings and Hluttaw or Parliament

S/N	Mosque	Images	Situation	Built	Quarter	Year	Comment/present administrator
1	East Masjid		Rakhine qrt. Taun Myint	Badon Min Bodaw\'s period			Rakhine Taungote Kamman Archers
2	West Masjid		Rakhine qrt. Taun Myint	Badon Min Bodaw\'s period			Rakhine Taungote Kamman Archers
3	Central Masjid		Rakhine qrt. Taun Myint	Radanabon period			Rakhine Taungote Kamman Archers
4	Mingala Masjid		Rakhine qrt. Taun Myint	Radanabon period			
5	Kauthali Masjid		Near Zaung Kalaw Pond	Radanabon period			Descendants
6	Yaedwin Pyet Rakhine Masjid		Near Zaung Kalaw Pond	Radanabon period			Descendants

== Chan Mya Tharzi Township, Amarapura Period Masjids ==
S/N	Mosque	images	Situation	Built	Quarter	Year	Comment/present administrator
1	Dawna Chan Masjid		Kyunelone Ou Shaung	Badon Min\'s time 1785			Dawna village head U Tharyar
2	Dawna Chan Masjid		Kyunelone Ou Shaung	Badon Min\'s time 1785			Dawna village head U Moe
3	Dawna Chan Masjid		Kyunelone Ou Shaung	U Shaban Daw Shin			1927 burnt & rebuilt
4	Dawna Chan Masjid		Kyunelone Ou Shaung	U Shaban Daw Shin			Hj U San Hj Daw Sae
5	Dawna Chan Masjid		Kyunelone Ou Shaung	U Shaban Daw Shin			Teak trader Hj U Ko Gyi
6	Khine Ywar Masjid		Chan Aye Tharzi	Gang Chief Dadalay Yaryar			Descendants
7	Thochan Masjid		Myo Thit (new town)	U Aung Pu and grandson Royal Chef U Ywet			Descendants

== History ==
During Pagan Min's reign, Mindon Prince and brother Ka Naung Prince ran away with their servants to Shwebo and started a rebellion. U Bo and U Yuet were the two Muslims who accompanied the princess. Some Kala Pyo Burmese Muslim artillery soldiers followed them.

In the Royal Defence Army, many Cannon-crew members were Kindar Kala Pyos and Myedu Muslims. Captain Min Htin Min Yazar’s 400 Muslims participated to clear the land for building a new Mandalay city. Kabul Maulavi was appointed an Islamic Judge by King Mindon to decide according to the Islamic rules and customs on Muslim affairs.

Burmese Muslims were given specific quarters to settle in the new city of Mandalay

King Mindon donated his palace teak pillars to build a mosque at North Obo in central Mandalay. His Majesty also permitted a mosque to be built on the granted site for the Panthays Burmese Chinese Muslims. Inside the Palace wall, for the Royal Body Guards, King Mindon himself donated and started the building of the Mosque by laying the Gold foundation at the South-eastern part of the Palace located near the present Independent Monument. This Mosque was called the Shwe Pannet Mosque. That mosque was destroyed by the British to build the Polo playground. The King donated the rest house in Mecca for his Muslim subjects performing Hajj.

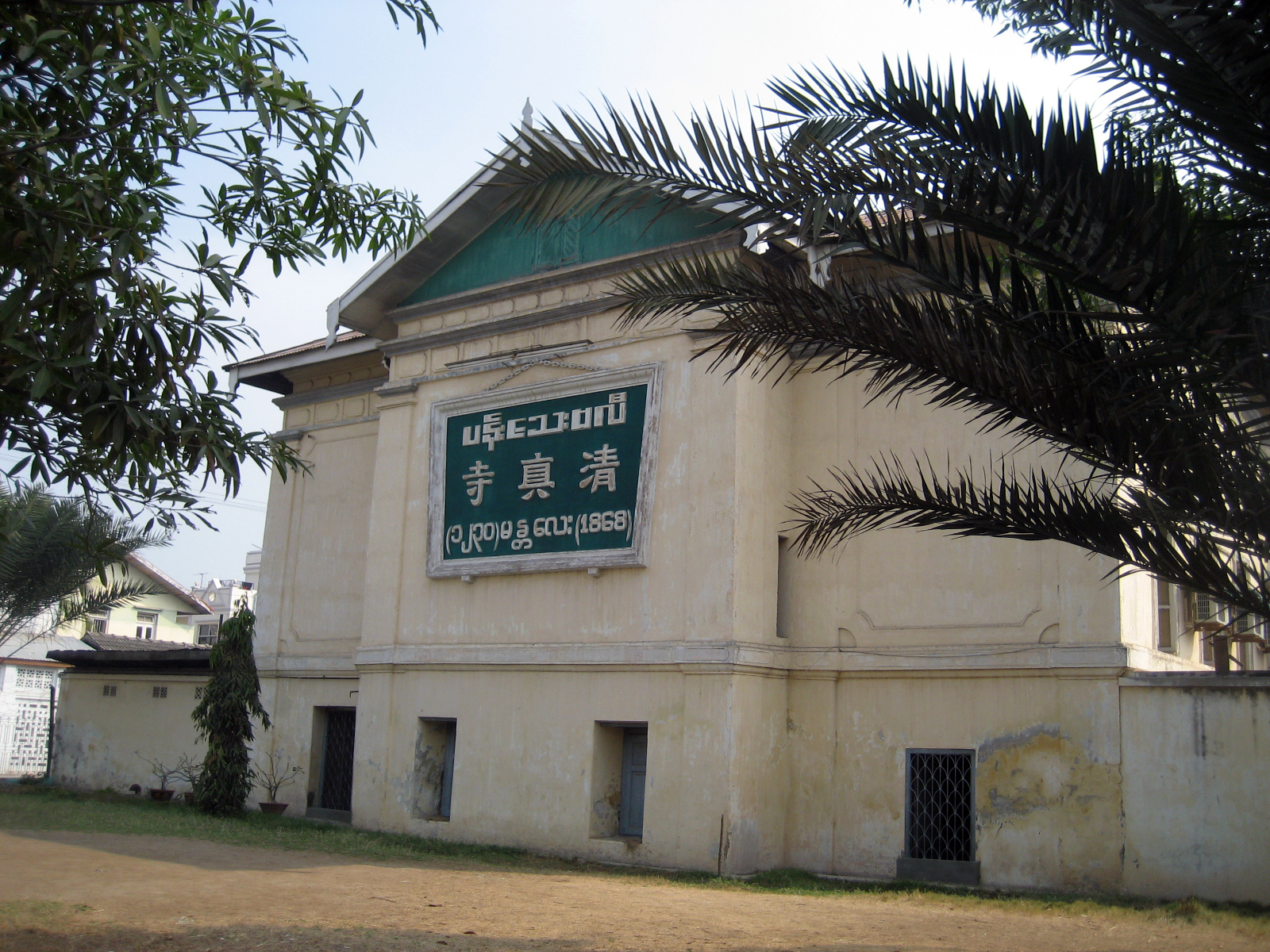
Panthay Mosque (清真寺, Qingzhensi) in Mandalay serves the Panthay community

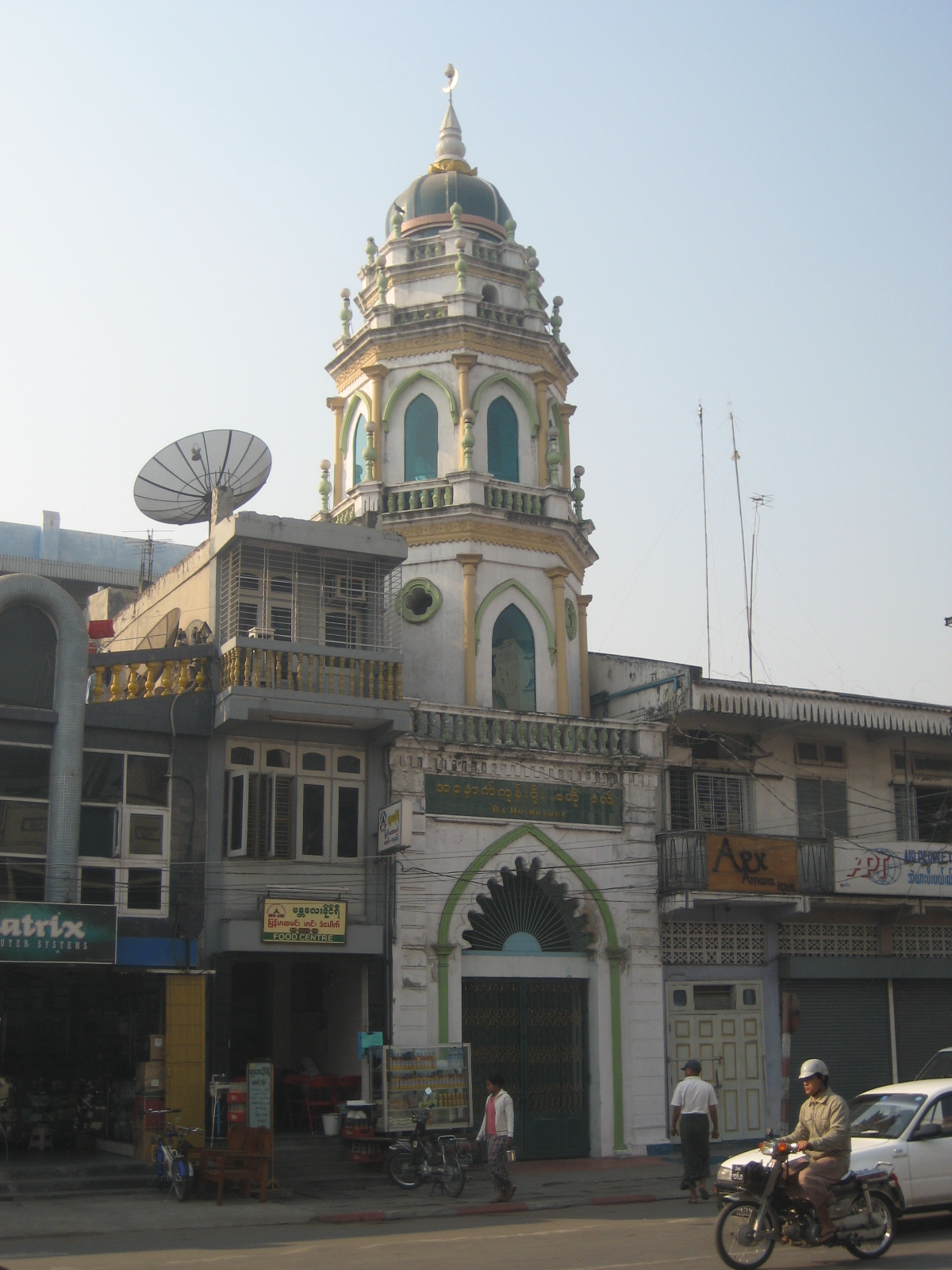
West Kone Yoe Central Mosque in Mandalay

== See also ==
- Islam in Myanmar
- Burmese Indians for Burmese Indian Muslims.
- Burmese Malays or Malays in Myanmar
- Bengalis
