= Burma pipistrelle =

Conservation status
- Data Deficient (IUCN 3.1)

Scientific classification
- Kingdom: Animalia
- Phylum: Chordata
- Class: Mammalia
- Order: Chiroptera
- Family: Vespertilionidae
- Genus: Hypsugo
- Species: H. lophurus

Binomial name
- Hypsugo lophurus (Thomas, 1915)
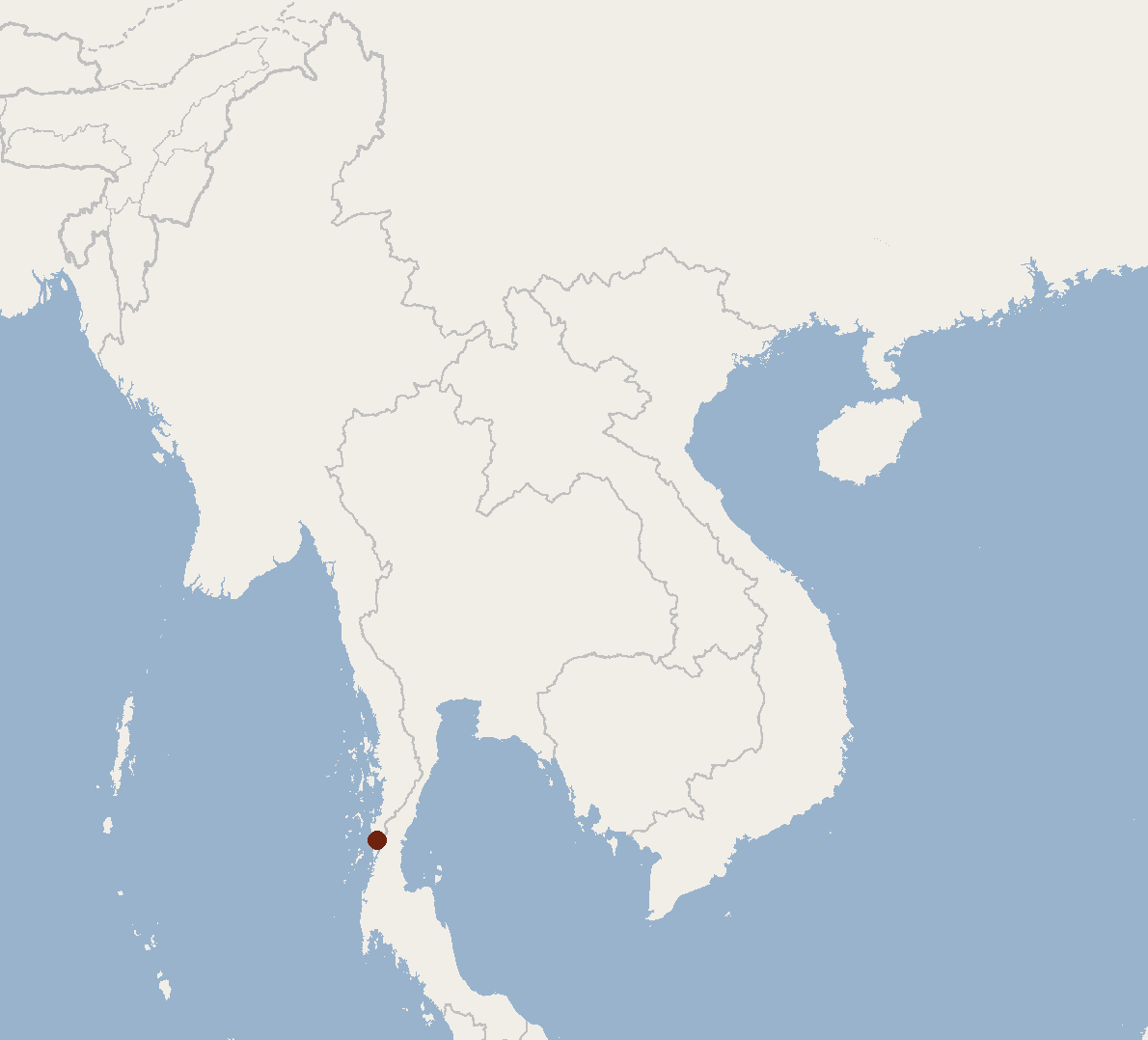

Synonyms
- Pipistrellus lophurus Thomas, 1915

Species of bat

The Burma pipistrelle (Hypsugo lophurus) is a species of vesper bat in the family Vespertilionidae found in Myanmar. It is known only from Maliwan in Tanintharyi Region.
