= Maliwan =

- Village
- Location within Myanmar
- Coordinates: 10°14′40″N 98°36′15″E
- Country: Myanmar
- Region: Taninthayi Region
- District: Kawthaung District
- Township: Kawthaung Township
- Time zone: UTC+6.30 (MST)

Maliwan (Burmese: မလိဝမ်း; Thai: มะลิวัลย์; RTGS: Maliwan) is a village in Kawthaung Township in southern Myanmar near the border with Thailand. It was settled by Chinese and Thai people. The area is known for its hot springs and waterfall. In 1872 the mayor of the third Mergui district, Sir Ashly Din (1870-1875), appointed the first police officer to Maliwan. A parliamentary paper to the British House of Commons in 1890 noted failed efforts to mine tin in the area, part of Tenasserim Division. In 1891, the center of local government was transferred from Maliwan to Victoria Point (Kawthaung) to allow easier access for larger ships.
