= Cinta Sayang (dance) =

Traditional Malay dance

- Native name: Tarian Cinta Sayang چينتا سايڠ
- Origin: Kedah (Malaysia)

Cinta Sayang (means Dear Love in Malay) is a traditional Malay dance originated from the state of Kedah in northern Peninsular Malaysia. The dance is popular amongst Kedah Malays as an opening dance for important events.

== Origins ==
The dance is originally called Zikir Rahmat (Remembrance of Blessings) in Malay. According to local story, the dance was said to have been invented in order to showcase how the family of fishermen say their goodbyes to the fishermen before they depart to the sea in order to make a living. The dance is also popular among local farmers as a way for them to entertain themselves after a hard day's work at the paddy fields.

== Description ==
Cinta Sayang dance is usually performed in pairs (male and female). Like most Malay dances, the men usually wear Baju Melayu while the women will wear an elaborate long shirt Kebaya with a long scarf slung over the shoulder.
