= Bokepyin =

Bokepyin Boke Pyin
- Town
- Boke Pyin
- Location in Burma
- Coordinates: 11.2500°N 98.7500°E
- Country: Myanmar
- Region: Tanintharyi Region
- District: Bokepyin District
- Township: Bokepyin Township
- Elevation: 10 m (33 ft)
- Time zone: UTC+6.30 (MST)

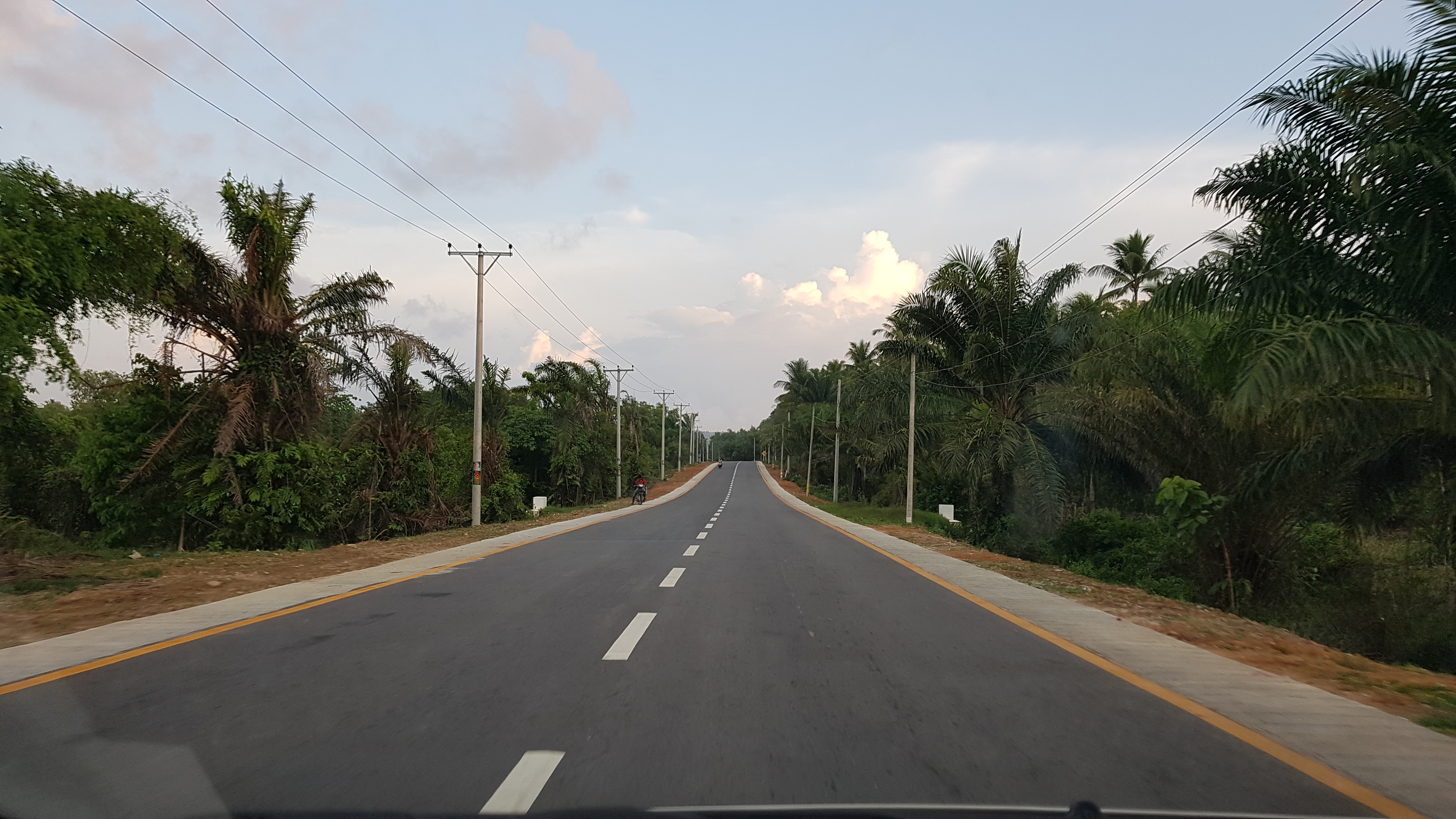
Kawthaung-Bokepyin Road NH1

Bokepyin (Burmese: ဘုတ်ပြင်းမြို့, Thai: บกเปี้ยน; RTGS: Bok Pian) is a town in Tanintharyi Region, Myanmar. In 2022, it was promoted to be the capital of the newly formed Bokepyin District.
