= Burmese Malays =

Myanmar Malays
Melayu Myanmar/Melayu Burma/ملايو ميانمار ပသျှူးလူမျိုး พม่าเชื้อสายมลายู
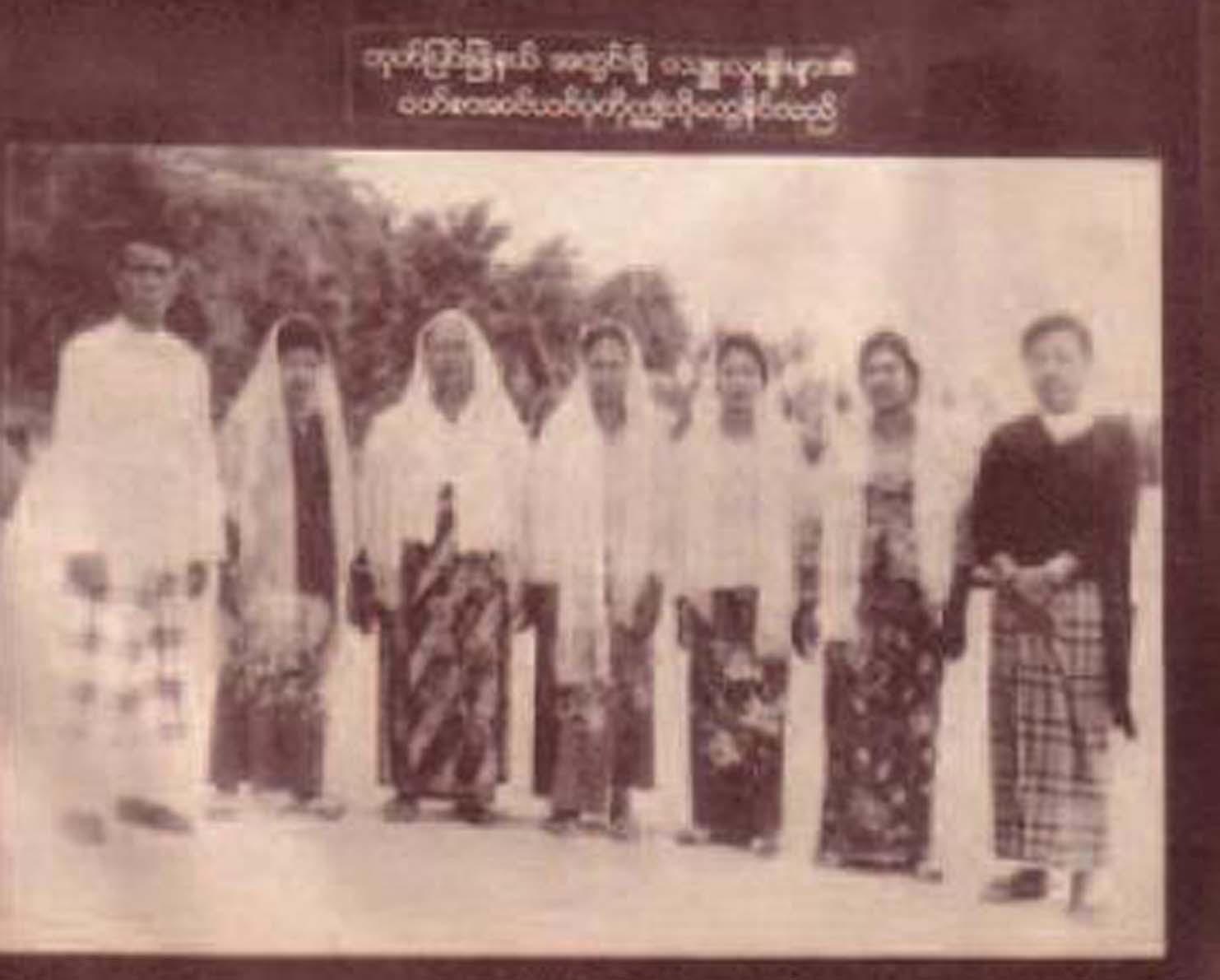
- A group of Burmese Malays in the 1950s.

Total population
- 27,000 in Myanmar (excluding the number of diaspora in Thailand and return migration to Malaysia)

Regions with significant populations
- Tanintharyi (mostly in Kawthaung District); Ranong, Thailand; Langkawi, Malaysia

Languages
- Kedah Malay · Southern Thai · Burmese

Religion
- Predominantly; Sunni Islam

Related ethnic groups
- Malays (especially Kedahan Malays and Satun Malays), Moken

Burmese Malays (Malay: Melayu Myanmar/Melayu Burma, Jawi: ملايو ميانمار, Burmese: ပသျှူးလူမျိုး, Pashu) are a Malay sub-group primarily living in Tanintharyi Region of southern Myanmar (Burma). There are some dispersed Malay from the northernmost states of Malaysia and from southern Thailand; they are believed to be of Kedahan Malay descent. Some of the Moken people in the Mergui Archipelago speak Malay.

== History ==
In 1865, an Arab-Malay group led by Nayuda Ahmed, traveling and collecting sea products around Mergui Archipelago settled down in Victoria Point Bay, now located in modern-day Kawthaung, which commenced the first wave of migration from Kedah. The Burmese Malays mainly live in Bokpyin Township and a few islands in the southern part of the Mergui Archipelago.

The Malay influence is clearly visible in the names of certain settlements near Kawthaung — the words Kampong, Ulu, Telok, Tengah, and Pulau (Malay words for village, remote, bay, central, and island respectively) appear in a handful of settlement names.

In the 1917 Ethnological Survey of Burma, there were 6,368 individuals identified as Malays.

== Demographics ==
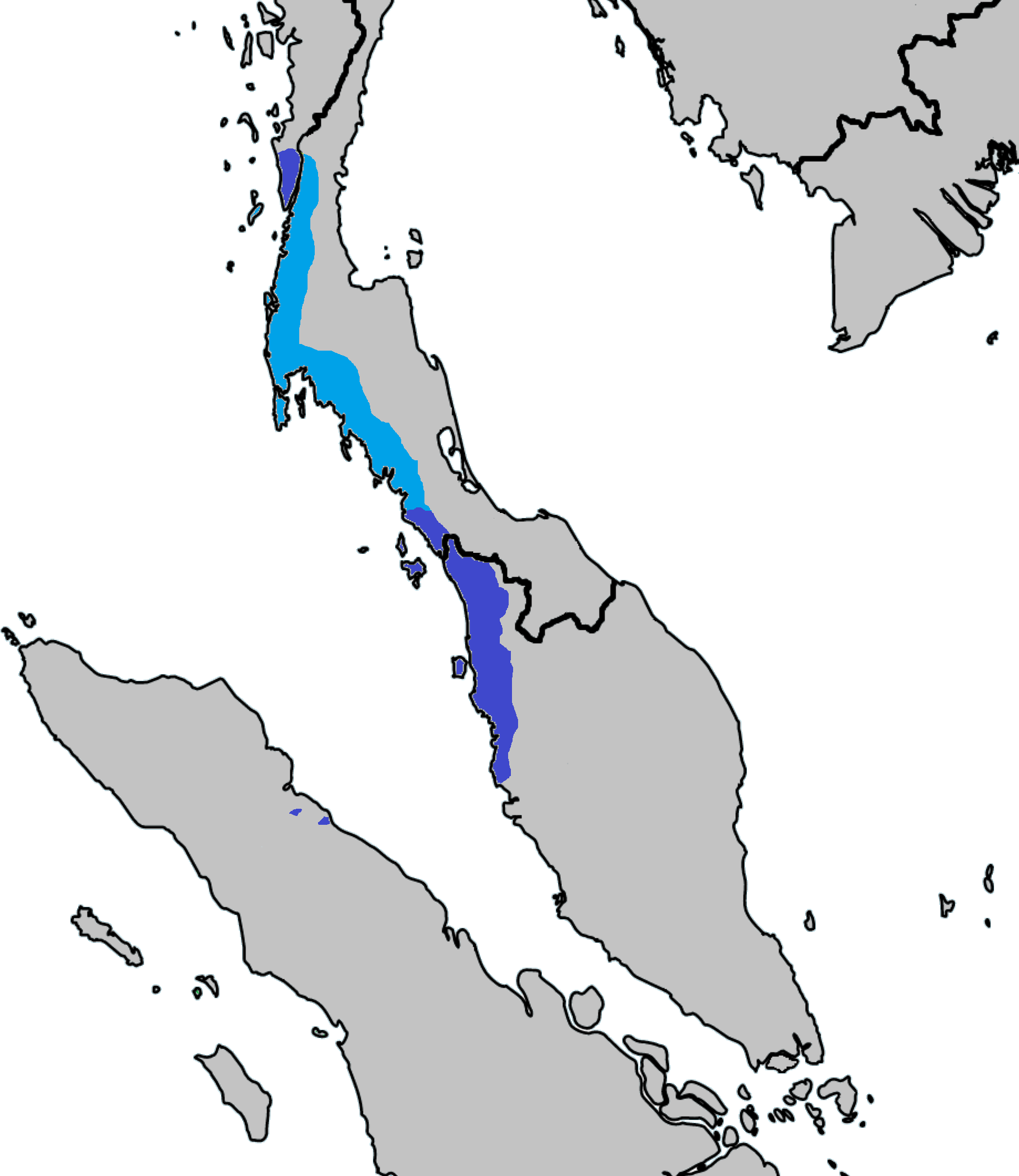
Distribution of Kedah Malay language Dark Blue: Regions where Kedahan is currently spoken, Blue: Regions where Kedahan is historically spoken

The Malays living in Southern Burma are related to the Kedahan Malay and maintain strong kinship, cultural and economic links to the northwest coast of Peninsular Malaysia (Kedah, Penang, and Perlis) and Southern Thailand (especially among the Malays in Ranong, Krabi, and Phuket) till today. They speak Burmese and the Kedah–Satun dialect. Due to the prevalence of Islamic religious schooling among the community, many of these Malays can also read the Jawi script which was the old Arabic-derived script used in the Malay Peninsula.

Most Malays are adherents of the Shafi'i madhab of Sunni Islam. The Mokens, although related to the Malays, have their own Austronesian languages and a separate cultural, societal and religious identity.

A sizable wave of return migration from Myanmar in 1980s has also resulted in a large settlement of Burmese Malay community that is concentrated in Bukit Malut, Langkawi, and Kedah. The present-day population is estimated to be around 8,000 individuals.

The 10,000 residents of Bukit Malut are essentially Malays and not ethnic Rohingya, according to Langkawi Member of Parliament Mahathir Mohamad. They were actually nomadic Malays who migrated to Thailand and Myanmar before moving back and settled in Langkawi. They all speak Malay well. Nearly 80% of them are fishermen who rely on marine life for a living, supplying fish to Langkawi and as far as Kelantan. They are self-sufficient.

== See also ==
- Malays (ethnic group), the ethnic group located primarily in the Malay peninsula, and parts of Sumatra and Borneo
- Malay race, a racial category encompassing the people of South East Asia and sometimes the Pacific Islands
- Overseas Malays, people of Malay ancestry living outside Malaysia and neighbouring ethnic Malay home areas
- Islam in Myanmar
