= Kedahan Malays =

Sub-group of Malays native to Northern Malaysia

Oghang Utagha / Melayu Kedah ملايو ﻗﺪﺡ
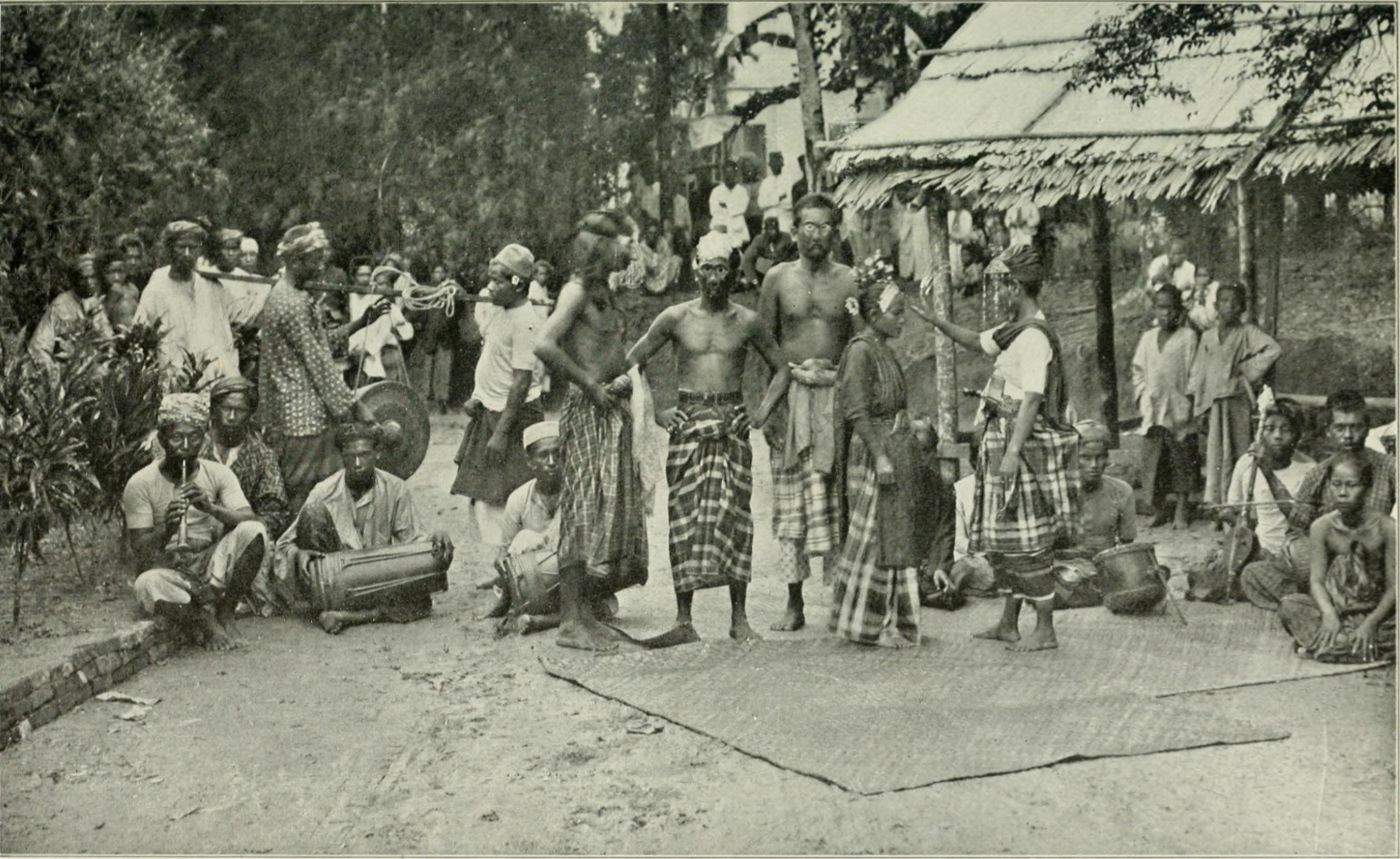
- A group of Malay band and dancers with painted faces in Kuala Muda, Kedah, 1905.

Total population
- 3.1 million

Regions with significant populations
- Malaysia (Perlis, Kedah, Penang and Northern Perak); Thailand (Satun, Trang, western part of Southern Thailand); Indonesia (Langkat regency in North Sumatra); Myanmar (Southern Myanmar)

Languages
- Kedah Malay (native), Malaysian, Thai, Burmese, Indonesian, English

Religion
- Sunni Islam

Related ethnic groups
- Other Malaysian Malays, Satun Malays, Burmese Malays, Kensiu, Jahai

Kedahan Malays (Malay: Melayu Kedah, Jawi: ملايو ﻗﺪﺡ) or commonly known as Orang Utara ('Northerners'), are a sub-group of Malays native to northern Malay Peninsula in areas of both current and historical area of Kedah (which is now divided into the modern states of Malaysia, Thailand and Myanmar). They are among the oldest ethnic groups in the Malay Peninsula with a history dating back 2,800 years as proven by the discovery of sites in Bujang Valley and historical documents from India, China and Arabia. Kedahan Malays are one of the largest Malay sub-groups in Malaysia, comprising at least 15% of the total Malaysian Malay population, including those with Kedahan ancestry.

== History ==
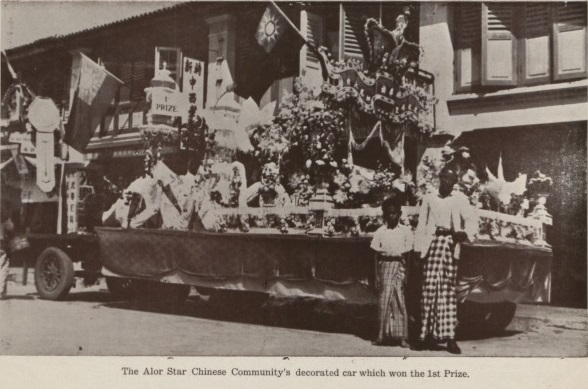
A Kedahan Malay man and his son standing in front of a decorated vehicle in Alor Setar, Kedah, 1937.

The early history of Kedah can be traced from various sources, from the prehistoric period, archaeological site of Bujang Valley, early maritime trade of India, Persia, and the Arabs to the written works of early Chinese pilgrims and early Chinese records. The Hikayat Merong Mahawangsa (known as Kedah Annals) and Al-Tarikh Salasilah Negeri Kedah are the most important documents about Kedah history.

By around 788 BCE, a large settlement had been established on the northern banks of the Merbok River which is located near the city of Sungai Petani today. The settlement was one of several in the Bujang Valley which makes it the largest archaeological site in the country. The Merbok settlement was built near the estuary of the tributary river, Sungai Batu. Around 170 CE, Hinduism was introduced to Kedah by traders or migrants from the Indian subcontinent, joining them soon were peoples from nearby islands (mainly Austronesians) and northern regions of the Kra Isthmus (mainly Mon-Khmers) that migrated to Kedah and assimilated with the local population. At the same time traders from China, Persia and Arabia, arrived at the brink of the Malacca Strait to Kedah, using Gunung Jerai as a marking point. Ancient Kedah civilization covered the areas of today's Kuala Kedah, Kuala Bara, Kuala Pila and Merpah.

In the 7th century, Kedah became part of Srivijaya, a thalassocracy which covers the whole of the Malay Peninsula and some parts of Sumatra and Java. Kedah remained an important trading, culture, political and religious centre throughout the Malay archipelago. However in the 11th century, King Rajendra Chola I of the Chola Empire sent an expedition to attack Kedah (Sri Vijaya) on behalf of one of its rulers who sought his assistance to gain the throne. This left Kedah in ruins after the war and became a vassal state for the Cholas Rajendra's overseas expedition against Srivijaya was a unique event in India's history and its otherwise peaceful relations with the states of Southeast Asia. Several places in present-day Indonesia and Malay Peninsula were invaded by Rajendra I of the Chola dynasty.

Even though Old Kedah was founded as a Hindu kingdom, the arrival of Arab Muslim traders in the 7th century introduced Islam to the kingdom. King Phra Ong Mahawangsa became the last Hindu king of Kedah before converting to Islam in 1136, which marks Kedah as the earliest Muslim kingdom in the Malay Peninsula and one of the earliest in Southeast Asia.

Kedah's prestige and influence declined significantly in the 14-15th century after the rise of its southern neighbour, Malacca and Ayutthaya Kingdom in the north. Kedah came under the influence of Ayutthaya until the 1456 Malaccan-Siamese war which led to Kedah becoming a vassal state for Malacca. The influence of Malacca led to the Malayisation of Kedahan people in the mid 15th century. In the early 17th century, the Aceh Sultanate became the new regional power in the region and invaded Kedah in 1629. Many Kedahans were forced to relocate elsewhere or were taken to Aceh as exiles.

The arrival of the British in the late 18th century forced Kedah to lease Penang as a protection from Siamese aggression. However, the treaty did not come to fruition as the British did not protect Kedah from Siamese invasion, which leads to Kedah attempting to take back Penang in 1790. The British managed to conduct a preemptive strike by attacking Kedah's fort and naval post and forced the Sultan of Kedah to sign a ceasefire agreement in 1791. Penang remained a British colony as part of the Straits Settlements alongside Singapore and Malacca until 1948, where it became a sovereign state within Malaya and later Malaysia.

Constant aggression from the Siamese against the strategically important Kedah led to the 1821 Siamese invasion of Kedah. The invasion devastated Kedah's political and economic stability including the exile of Sultan Ahmad Tajuddin Halim Shah II, partition of Kedah into smaller kingdoms (Setul, Perlis and the Kubang Pasu) and direct Siamese rule over Kedah for over 20 years until its independence was restored in 1842. Kubang Pasu were reunited with Kedah in 1859 but Perlis and Setul remained independent until 1909, when the Anglo-Siamese Treaty caused the division of British-influence Perlis and Kedah and Siamese-controlled Setul (which would later become the province of Satun). Kedah, along with 11 other states joined the Federation of Malaya in 1948 and later as a state within Malaysia in 1963.

== Demonym ==
Nowadays, the term Kedahan Malay only refers to the Malays living in Kedah. Despite being ethnically similar to Kedah Malays, the Malays of Perlis and Penang prefer to identify themselves as Orang Utara or "People of the Northern Region" instead of Kedahan Malay as the term Orang Utara is more politically neutral. This also extends to their language, which is called Pelat Utara or Northern Dialect. However, the Kedahan population in Langkat (Indonesia), Pulau Dua (Myanmar) and Satun (Thailand) still call themselves as Orang Kedah or Kedah people due to their historical ties to Kedah Sultanate prior to the partition.

However, not all Malays living in Kedah call themselves as Melayu Kedah. In the interior parts of Kedah such as in Baling and Sik, they usually call themselves as Orang Patani as the people there are the descendants of Malay settlers from the historical region of Pattani which is now in modern day southern Thailand. They maintain their own unique dialect/language, tradition and identity from Kedahan Malays.

== Language ==
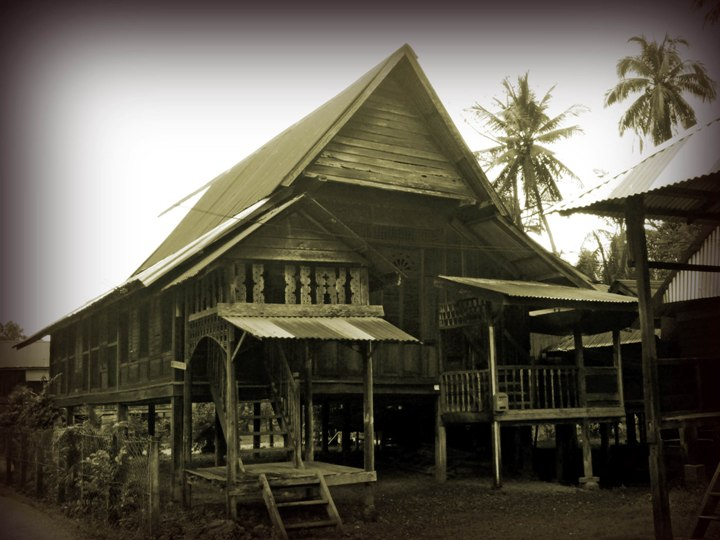
An old traditional Kedahan Malay style house.

The Kedahan Malays have their own unique variety of Malay known as Kedah Malay or Pelat Utagha (northern dialect) as known by its native speakers. It is related to other varieties of Malay spoken in the peninsula but has its own unique pronunciation and vocabulary which makes it unintelligible to other Malays in the region. Kedahan Malay language can be divided into several sub-dialects, namely Kedah Persisiran (coastal dialect; standard) or Kedah Hulu (interior), Kedah Utara (northern Kedah), Perlis-Langkawi, Penang and some others (sub-dialects spoken in Satun and Southern Myanmar). For instance instead of using kamu to denote as 'you', hang (English pronunciation: hung) is used instead and cek or kami for 'i/me' instead of saya / aku in other Malay varieties in the peninsula. Besides proper Kedah Malay, another variety of Malay spoken in Kedah is Baling Malay, which is an offshoot of Kelantan-Patani Malay but has absorbed influences from Kedah Malay. Kedah Malay is considered distinct enough to have its own ISO code that is meo.

== Customs and culture ==
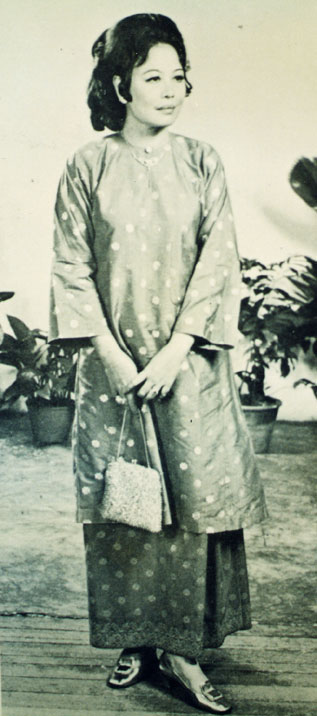
Kedahan Malay woman in traditional attire, 1930

Due to their long history, Kedahan Malays have their own unique cuisines, customs and traditions compared to the rest of Malaysia.

=== Cuisine ===
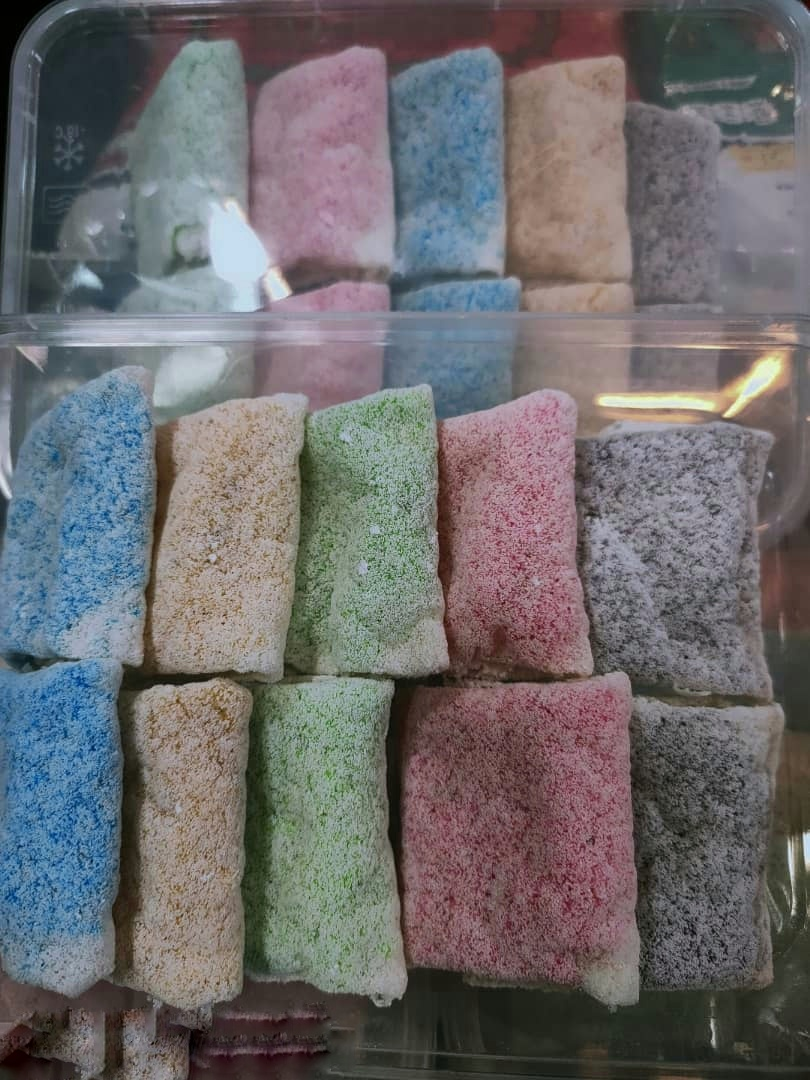
Kuih Bunga Pundak

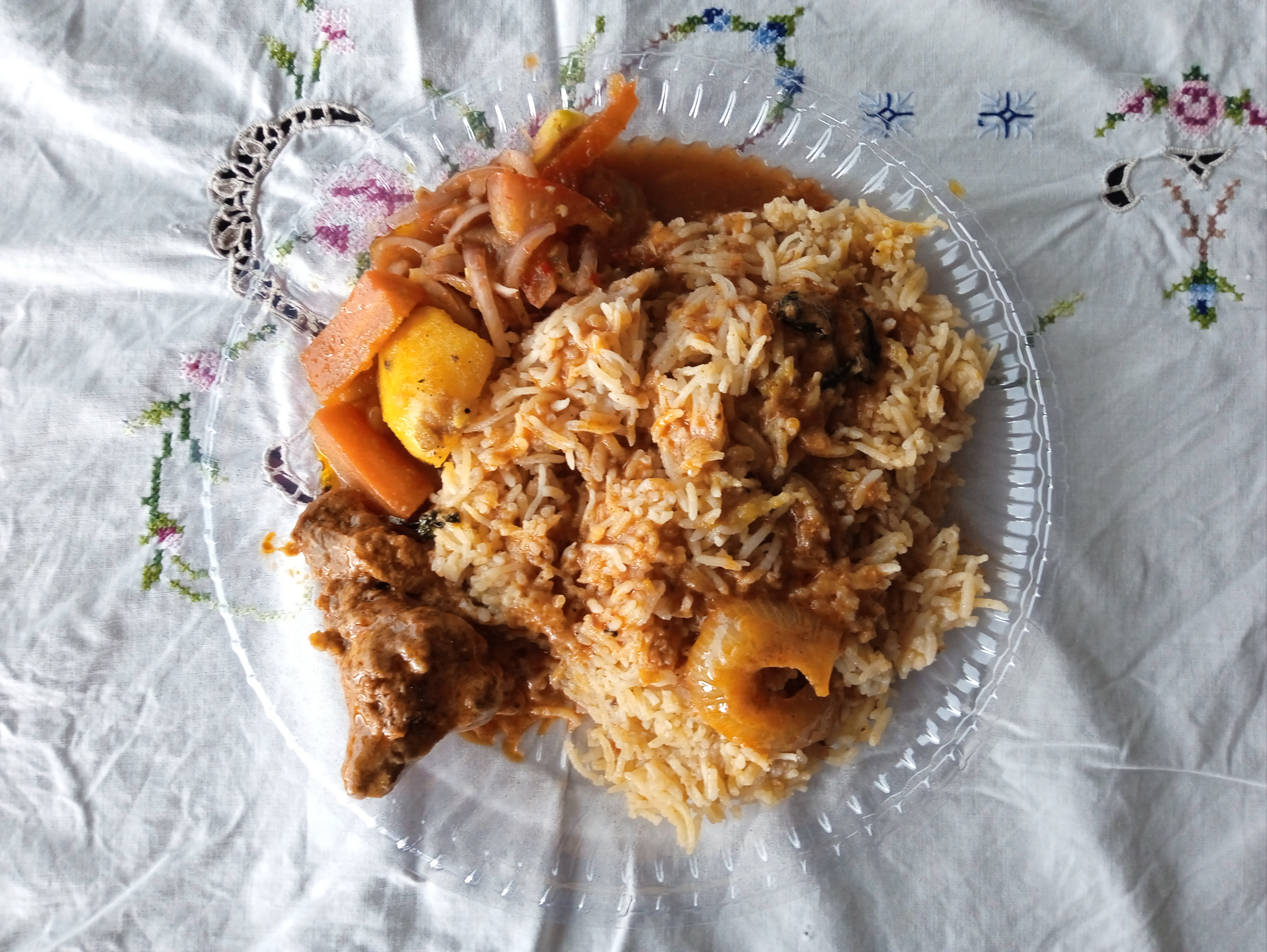
Nasi daging air asam

- Nasi Daging Air Asam
- Kuih Dangai
- Kuih Peneram
- Pek Nga
- Karas
- Pulut Mangga
- Pulut Durian
- Nasi Lemuni
- Kuih Bunga Pundak

=== Dance theater ===
- Mek Mulung
- Mak Yong Kedah
- Jikey
- Boria (theatre): The most famous Kedahan culture of Indian origin. It is quite similar to a musical theater. The theater used a fully Kedahan Malay language while the song used a mix of standard Malay and Kedahan accent or sometimes, a fully standard Malay. This theater is said to be created after the hybrid of Malay and Indian culture in Penang.
- Inai dance
- Canggung dance: A dance originating from Perlis but also very popular in Kedah and Penang
- Cinta Sayang dance: a popular opening dance in Kedah.

=== Art theater ===
- Wayang Kulit Gedek

=== Customs ===
- Berendul (pronunciation: be-ghen-doi): A group of men would sing traditional Kedahan folk songs to a newborn baby in celebration of birth of the child.

=== Poetry ===
- Ghazal Kedah

=== Martial arts ===
- Silat Kuntau Tekpi: A Silat Melayu style that was founded by Panglima Taib bin Wan Hussain who was a Panglima (Palace Warrior-General) of the empire of Kedah. It is also a 'sister-art' of silat styles that stemmed from Panglima Tok Rashid, including Silat Kalimah and Silat Cekak.
- Silat Cekak: A Silat Melayu style that was founded by Ustaz Hanafi, a Kedahan Malay but is now popular throughout Malaysia and to some extent in Indonesia as well.

== In popular culture ==
=== Films ===
- Raja Bersiong
- Rempit V3
- Hikayat Merong Mahawangsa
- Cun (2011)

=== Television series ===
- Cinta Anak Kedah
- Makbul
- Dari Kodiang ke Kolumpo.
- Mak Cun
- Kak Marr

== Notable Kedahan Malay ==
- Abdul Rahman Abbas, Yang di-Pertua Negeri of Penang from 2001 to 2021
- Abdul Hamid Omar, last Lord President of the Supreme Court from 1989 to 1992 and Chief Justice of Malaysia from 1989 to 1994
- Abdullah Ahmad Badawi, 5th Prime Minister of Malaysia from 2003 to 2009 (Kedahan Malay of Chinese and Arab descent)
- Ahmad Bashah Md Hanipah, former Deputy Minister of Domestic Trade and Consumer Affairs, Chief Minister of Kedah from 2016 to 2018
- Anwar Ibrahim, current 10th Prime Minister of Malaysia
- Askora Asbar, Malaysian and International Ping Pong star
- Azizan Abdul Razak, Chief Minister of Kedah from 2008 to 2013
- Azmi Khalid, former Deputy Minister of Natural Resources and Environment
- Surin Pitsuwan, 12th Secretary General of the Association of Southeast Asian Nations (ASEAN), Thailand Minister of Foreign Affairs from 1997 to 2001
- Farid Kamil, Malaysian actor
- Bront Palarae, Malaysian actor, screenwriter, director and producer
- Janna Nick, Malaysian actress and singer (Kedahan Malay with Chinese, Thai and Indo/Pakistani descent)
- Ahmad Fairuz Abdul Halim, Chief Justice of Malaysia from 2003 to 2006
- Hani Mohsin, Malaysian actor and TV host
- Johari Abdul, Malaysian Government Backbencher Leader from 2018 to 2020
- Mohamed Dzaiddin Abdullah, Chief Justice of Malaysia from 2000 to 2003
- House of Jamalullail (Perlis), the ruling royal family of the state of Perlis (Kedahan Malay with Arab descent)
- Mahathir Mohamad, Malaysian 4th and 7th Prime Minister from 1981 to 2003 and from 2018 to 2020 (Kedahan Malay with Indian descent)
- Mahdzir Khalid, former Minister of Education, Chief Minister of Kedah from 2005 to 2008
- Zaki Azmi, Chief Justice of Malaysia from 2008 to 2011
- Mazlan Ahmad, famous Malaysian comedian
- Azmi Mohamed, Lord President of the Supreme Court from 1968 to 1974
- Muhammad Sanusi Md Nor, current Chief Minister of Kedah
- Mukhriz Mahathir, former Deputy Minister of International Trade and Industry (MITI), Chief Minister of Kedah from 2013 to 2016 and from 2018 to 2020
- Osman Aroff, Chief Minister of Kedah from 1985 to 1996
- P. Ramlee, Malay film actor (Kedahan Malay maternal ancestry, Acehnese father)
- Rozita Che Wan, Malaysian actress and personality
- Sanusi Junid, former Minister of Agriculture, Chief Minister of Kedah from 1996 to 1999
- Sharifah Rodziah Syed Alwi Barakbah, Spouse of the 1st Prime Minister of Malaysia
- Syed Ahmad Syed Mahmud Shahabuddin, Chief Minister of Kedah from 1967 to 1978 and Yang di-Pertua Negeri of Malacca from 1984 to 2004
- Syed Mokhtar Al-Bukhary, the 7th richest corporate figure in Malaysia (Kedahan Malay with Arab descent)
- Syed Razak Syed Zain Barakbah, Chief Minister of Kedah from 1999 to 2005
- Syed Sheh Hassan Barakbah, Lord President of the Supreme Court from 1966 to 1968, 3rd Yang di-Pertua Negeri of Penang from 1969 to 1975 and President of the Dewan Negara from 1959 to 1969
- Syed Sheh Shahabudin, 2nd Yang di-Pertua Negeri of Penang
- Tunku Abdul Rahman, 1st Prime Minister of Malaysia, also regarded as "Father of Independence" and member of the Kedah royal family (Kedahan Malay with Thai descent)
- Zulkifli Ismail, Malaysian actor
- Abdul Hamid Mohamad, Chief Justice of Malaysia from 2006 to 2008
- Zulkiflee Anwar Haque, a political cartoonist famously known as Zunar and a 2016 Cartooning for Peace Prize winner.
- Akhyar Rashid, Malaysian footballer
- Faiz Subri , Penerima Anugerah Puskas award 2016

== See also ==
- Kedah Wayang kulit Seri ansun
- Malays (ethnic group), the ethnic group located primarily in the Malay peninsula, and parts of Sumatra and Borneo
- Malay race, a racial category encompassing the people of South East Asia and sometimes the Pacific Islands
- Malaysian Malays, a constitutionally defined group of Muslim Malaysian citizens
- Malay Singaporeans
- Malay Indonesians, ethnic Malays in Indonesia
- Thai Malays, ethnic Malays in Thailand
- Sri Lankan Malays, an ethnic group in Sri Lanka of Indonesian ancestry
- Cape Malays, an ethnic group or community in South Africa
- Cocos Malays, the predominant group ethnic group of the Cocos (Keeling) Islands, now part of Australia
- Overseas Malays, people of Malay ancestry living outside Malaysia and neighbouring ethnic Malay home areas
- Burmese Malays
