= Kawthaung Township =

- Township
- Location in Kawthaung district

- Location in Burma
- Coordinates: 9°59′N 98°33′E
- Country: Burma
- Region: Taninthayi Region
- District: Kawthaung District
- Capital: Kawthaung

Area
  - Total: 2,527 km^{2} (976 sq mi)

Population (2014)
  - Total: 140,020
  - Density: 55.41/km^{2} (143.5/sq mi)
- Time zone: UTC+6.30 (MST)

Kawthaung Township (Burmese: ကော့သောင်းမြို့နယ်; Thai: เกาะสอง, RTGS: Ko Song; lit. 'Second Island') is a township of Kawthaung District in the Taninthayi Division of Myanmar. The principal town is Kawthaung. The township covers an area of 2,527 km^{2}, and had a population of 140,020 at the 2014 Census.

== History ==
In 1859, a local Chinese and Thai group settled at Maliwan, a village 24 miles north of Kawthaung (then Victoria Point). Maliwan is noted for its numerous lakes and flower trees called Maliwan in Thai Language. And in 1865, an Arab-Malay group led by Nayuda Ahmed, traveling and collecting sea products around Mergui Archipelago start to form a base and village at bay of Victoria Point.

In 1872 the third mayor of Mergui District, Sir Ashly Din (1870–1875) assigned the first police officer to be stationed at Maliwan. In 1891, the local government offices were moved from Maliwan to Kawthaung because Maliwan is located on the bank of a small shallow river, Maliwan Creek, unsuitable for large ships to enter and waiting tide water.
