= Bokepyin District =

Bokepyin Township Bokepyin District ဘုတ်ပြင်းမြို့နယ် ဘုတ်ပြင်းခရိုင်
- Township
- Location in Tanintharyi Region
- Coordinates: 11°16′34″N 98°46′37″E
- Country: Myanmar
- Region: Tanintharyi Region
- District: Bokepyin District
- Capital: Bokepyin

Area
  - Total: 6,651 km^{2} (2,568 sq mi)

Population (2014)
  - Total: 81,718
  - Density: 12.29/km^{2} (31.82/sq mi)
- Time zone: UTC+6.30 (MST)

Bokepyin Township (Burmese: ဘုတ်ပြင်းမြို့နယ်; Thai: บกเปี้ยน; RTGS: Bok Pian) is the only township of Bokepyin District (Burmese: ဘုတ်ပြင်းခရိုင်) in central Taninthayi Region, Myanmar. The capital town is Bokepyin. The township covers an area of 6,651 km^{2} (2,568 sq mi), and had a population of 81,718 at the 2014 census.

The township was split from Kawthaung District on 30 April 2022 by the Ministry of Home Affairs to form its own district.

The township and district has two subtownships, informal subdivisions used for administrative and statistical purposes- Pyigyimandaing Subtownship and Karathuri Subtownship.
