= Kedah Malay =

Malay dialect of northwestern Malaysia and Thailand

- بهاس ملايو قدح ภาษามลายูไทรบุรี
- Pelat Utagha; Bahasa Melayu Kedah, Bahasa Melayu Utara
- Native to: Malaysia, Thailand, Myanmar and Indonesia
- Region: Kedah, Pulau Pinang, Perlis, northern Perak (Kerian, Manjung, Larut, Matang and Selama), Trang, Satun, Ranong, Tanintharyi, Langkat, Aceh
- Ethnicity: Kedahan Malays; Thai Malays; Burmese Malays; Jaring Halus Malays
- Native speakers: 2.6 million (2004)
- Language family: Austronesian: Malayo-Polynesian; (disputed); Malayic; Kedah Malay
- Dialects: Coastal Kedah; Northern Kedah; Perlis-Langkawi; Penang; Satun; Jaring Halus
- Writing system: Latin script, Arabic script, Thai script

Language codes
- ISO 639-3: meo
- Glottolog: keda1251

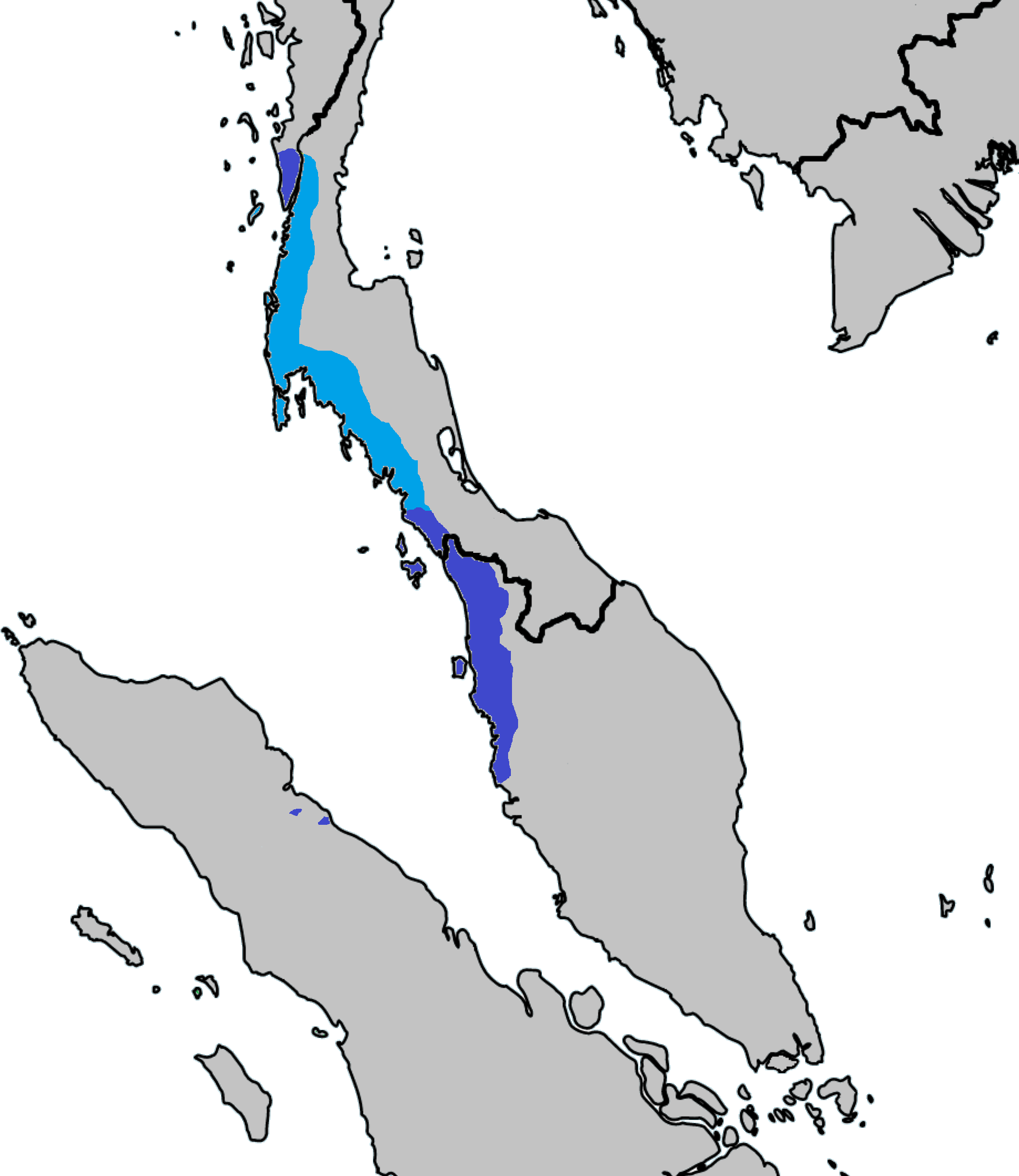
Distribution of Kedah Malay language Dark Blue: Regions where Kedahan is currently spoken, Blue: Regions where Kedahan is historically spoken

A young man speaks Kedah Malay

Kedah Malay or Kedahan (Malay: bahasa Melayu Kedah; also known as Pelat Utara or Loghat Utara 'Northern Dialect') or as it is known in Thailand, Syburi Malay (Thai: ภาษามลายูไทรบุรี Phasa Malāyū Saiburī) is a Malayic language mainly spoken in the northwestern Malaysian states of Perlis, Kedah, Penang, and northern Perak and in the southern Thai provinces of Trang and Satun. The usage of Kedah Malay was historically prevalent in southwestern Thailand before being superseded by the Thai language. Enclaves of Kedah Malay can be found in Kawthaung District in Myanmar; Ranong and Krabi in upper southern Thailand; Jaring Halus, Langkat and Aceh in Sumatra, Indonesia and up north in Bangkok, central Thailand, where most of the Kedah Malay speakers are descendants of historical settlers from Kedah.

Kedah Malay can be divided into several dialects, namely Coastal Kedah (Kedah Persisiran; which is the de facto prestige dialect of Kedah Malay), Northern Kedah (Kedah Utara), Perlis-Langkawi, Penang and some others outside Malaysia. (Note: See Malayan languages for a comparison between Kedah Persisiran and Penang dialects.) Speakers in Trang as well as Satun are heavily influenced by the Thai language. However in the district of Baling, they speak a different variant more closely related to Kelantan-Patani Malay than it is to Kedah Malay.

== Phonology ==
=== Consonants ===
	Labial	Alveolar	Palato-alveolar	Dorsal	Uvular	Glottal
Plosive	p b	t d	t͡ʃ d͡ʒ	k ɡ	q~χ	ʔ
Fricative		s			ʁ	h
Nasal	m	n	ɲ	ŋ		
Trill		(r)				
Approximant		l	j	w		

Note(s):

- /ʁ/ corresponds to Standard Malay prevocalic and intervocalic /r/ whereby ramai (many) is pronounced as /ʁamaj/.
  - In the Tanjung subdialect of the Pulau Pinang dialect of Kedah Malay, /ʁ/ is pronounced as [ɣ] or [r] so the aforementioned word would be pronounced as [ɣamaj] or [ramaj] instead.
  - [ʕ] is an allophone of /ʁ/ and corresponds to Standard Malay word-final /r/ so Standard Malay bakar /bakar/ (to burn) would be pronounced as [bakaʕ] in Kedah Malay.
- /q~χ/ corresponds to /kər~kr/ in Standard Malay and can be found in words such as qija [qəd͡ʒa] "to work" and qeyang dot [qəjaŋ dot] "java plum", though it may be obsolete in other dialects
- /r/ is only found in certain loanwords and onomatopoeic words such as arnab /arnap/ (rabbit) and brang /braŋ/ (sound of plate falling).
- Velar nasal /ŋ/ does not occur following /i/ and instances of that in Standard Malay correspond to /n/ in Kedah Malay so Standard Malay kucing /kut͡ʃiŋ/ 'cat' and kuning /kuniŋ/ 'yellow' are pronounced /kut͡ʃin/ and /kunin/ in Kedah Malay (and even spelt accordingly in rare manuscript instances i.e. کوچين for the former) though some argue that the final consonant is still underlyingly /ŋ/ as can be seen from the derived forms of these words such as kekuningan /kəkuniŋan/ 'yellowness' [kəkuniŋan] which retains the [ŋ].
- Word-final Standard Malay /s/ corresponds to /h/ in Kedah Malay, so Standard Malay kurus /kurus/ 'thin' is pronounced /kuʁujh/ in Kedah Malay.
- Word-final /l/ after /a/ and /u/ in Standard Malay corresponds to Kedah Malay /j/ so a word like tebal /təbal/ is pronounced /təbaj/ in Kedah Malay.
- In the Northern Kedah and Perlis-Langkawi dialects, the homorganic nasal-oral consonant clusters /mb, ŋɡ, nd/ can have its oral portion removed so lembu (cow), tunggu (to wait) and mandi (to bathe) can respectively be pronounced as either /ləmbu/ or /ləmu/, /tuŋɡu/ or /tuŋu/ and /mandi/ or /mani/. In the case that the oral portion is retained, it is weakly pronounced in the Perlis-Langkawi dialect so /ləmbu/ (cow) would be realized as [ləmᵇu].

=== Vowels ===
==== Monophthongs ====
Kedah Malay has eight monophthongs, unlike Standard Malay which has six with /ɛ/ and /ɔ/ not having phonemic status.

	Front	Central	Back
Close	i		u
Close-Mid	e		o
Mid		ə	
Open-Mid	ɛ		ɔ
Open		a	

==== Diphthongs ====
Kedah Malay has four diphthongs /aj, aw, oj, uj/ with /uj/ being the only one that does not exist in Standard Malay.

Coda	/j/	/w/
/a/	/aj/	/aw/
/o/	/oj/	
/u/	/uj/	

==== Change of Standard Malay Vowel Clusters ====
In Kedah Malay, Standard Malay instances of vowel clusters correspond to usually a diphthong (e.g. Standard Malay baik (good) /ba.ik/ ≙ Kedah Malay /bajʔ/) or less commonly, a monophthong (e.g. Standard Malay biasa (normal) /bi.a.sa/ ≙ Kedah Malay /bɛ.sa/) in Kedah Malay. The /i.a/ vowel cluster still occurs though in positions that correspond to Standard Malay word-final /ir/ (e.g. Standard Malay pasir (sand) /pa.sir/ ≙ Kedah Malay /pa.si.aʕ/.

=== Comparison with Standard Malay ===
Below is a table showing sound correspondences between Kedah Malay and Standard Malay.

Standard Malay Sound	Kedah Malay Correspondence	Example (Standard Malay ≙ Kedah Malay)		
/-al/	/-aj/	tebal /təbal/ 'thick'	≙	/təbaj/
/-ul/	/-oj/	pukul /pukul/ 'to hit'	≙	/pukoj/
/-il/	/-e/	katil /katil/ 'bed'	≙	/kate/
/-el/	/-ɛ/	comel /t͡ʃomel/ 'cute'	≙	/t͡ʃɔmɛ/
/-a.ul/	/-oj/ (Coastal Kedah) /-aj/ (Northern Kedah)	gaul /ɡa.ul/ 'to mix'	≙	/ɡoj/ (Coastal Kedah) /ɡaj/ (Northern Kedah)
/-as/	/-ajh/	malas /malas/ 'lazy'	≙	/malajh/
/-us/	/-ujh/ /-ojh/ (Perlis-Langkawi)	bagus /baɡus/ 'good'	≙	/baɡujh/ /baɡojh/ (Perlis-Langkawi)
/-is/	/-eh/	tapis /tapis/ 'to filter'	≙	/tapeh/
/-oh/	/-ɔ/	bodoh /bodoh/ 'stupid'	≙	/bɔdɔ/
/-ar/	/-aʕ/	lapar /lapar/ 'hungry'	≙	/lapaʕ/
/-ur/	/-ɔʕ/ /-u.aʕ/ (Perlis-Langkawi)	bubur /bubur/ 'porridge'	≙	/bu.bɔʕ/ /bu.bu.aʕ/ (Perlis-Langkawi)
/-ur/	/-ɔʕ/ /-ɔ.aʕ/ (Perlis-Langkawi)	tohor /tohor/ 'shallow'	≙	/tɔ.hɔʕ/ /tɔ.hɔ.aʕ/ (Perlis-Langkawi)
/-ir/	/-i.aʕ/	hampir /ham.pir/ 'nearly'	≙	/ham.pi.aʕ/
/-a.ir/	/-a.jaʕ/	air /a.ir/ 'water'	≙	/a.jaʕ/
/-ut/	/-u.əʔ/ (Perlis-Langkawi)	lutut /lutut/ 'knee'	≙	/lu.tu.əʔ/ (Perlis-Langkawi)
/i.a/	/ja/	biar /bi.ar/	≙	/bjaʕ/
/i.a/	/ɛ/	biasa /bi.a.sa/ 'normal'	≙	/bɛ.sa/
/i.a/	/a/	siapa /si.a.pa/ 'who'	≙	/sa.pa/
/u.a/	/wa/	buah /bu.ah/	≙	/bwah/
/u.a/	/ɔ/	kuala /ku.a.la/ 'estuary'	≙	/kɔ.la/
/a.i/	/aj/	baik /ba.ik/ 'good'	≙	/bajʔ/
/a.hi/	/aj/	dahi /da.hi/ 'forehead'	≙	/daj/
/-a.u/	/aw/	bau /ba.u/ 'smell'	≙	/baw/
/-a.hu/	/aw/	mahu /ma.hu/ 'to want'	≙	/maw/
/-a.u-/	/aw/ /aj/ (Northern Kedah)	daun /da.un/ 'leaf'	≙	/dawn/ /dajn/ (Northern Kedah)
/-a.hu-/	/aw/ /aj/ (Northern Kedah)	tahun /ta.hun/ 'year'	≙	/tawn/ /tajn/ (Northern Kedah)

== Vocabulary ==
Pronouns
Kedah Malay	Standard Malay	English Translation
hang	awak/kamu/kau	'you' (singular)
hangpå/hampå	kalian	'you' (plural)
cek/aku	saya/aku	'I'
cek	saya	'I' (young to old)
cek	kamu	'you' (old to young)
depå/lepå	mereka	'they'
sépå (In a few certain areas) / kitorang	kami	'we' (exclusive)

Question Words
Kedah Malay	Standard Malay	English Translation
sapadiå, sapå	siapa/siapakah	'who'
apå,på,padiå,natangpå	apa/apakah	'what'
bilå,mengkalå	bila/bilakah	'when'
genå, lagumanå	bagaimana/bagaimanakah	'how'
manå	mana	'where'
pasaipå,sepå,awat, buatpå, sebabpå	mengapa	'why'
bapå	berapa	'how much'

Basic Words
Kedah Malay	Standard Malay	English Translation
camcå	sudu	'spoon'
habaq	cakap	'talk'
mai	datang, mari	'come'
mau	nak	'want'
payah	susah	'difficult'
lå, lani	sekarang	'now'
lagu	macam	'sort'
cabai	cili/lada	'chilli'
hakap	tamak	'greedy'
pi	pergi	'go'
sat	sebentar, sekejap	'one second'
mengkalā	bila, apabila	'when'
ketegaq	degil, keras kepala	'stubborn'
geghék,beskat	basikal	'bicycle'
mertun	tukul	'hammer'
lempaq	baling	'throw'
ghabat,ghagaih	memanjat	'climb'
ligan	kejar	'chase'
loqlaq	tak senonoh	'indecent'
ketit	gigit kecil	'bite softly'
tokak	gigit	'bite'
belemoih	comot	'messy'
cemuih	bosan	'bored'
