= Kawthaung District =

District of Tanintharyi Region, Myanmar

Coordinates: 11°03′N 98°51′E

Location in Tanintharyi Region

Kawthoung District (Burmese: ကော့သောင်ခရိုင်) is a district of Tanintharyi Region, Myanmar. The district covers an area of 9,178 km^{2}, and had a population of 221,738 at the 2014 census.

== Administrative divisions ==
The district comprises the following one township and one subtownship:

=== Townships ===
- Kawthaung Township (population: 81,718; 12.29/km^{2})

=== Subtownships ===
- Khamaukgyi Subtownship
