= Tenasserim =

Tenasserim may refer to:

- Tenasserim Division, also known as the Tenasserim coast, or Tenasserim peninsula, former name of the Tanintharyi Region in Myanmar (Burma)
- Tenasserim town, a former name of Tanintharyi (town)
- Tenasserim Hills or Tenasserim Range, part of the Indo-Malayan mountain system in Southeast Asia
- Tenasserim Island, an island in the Mergui Archipelago in Myanmar (Burma)
- Great Tenasserim River, a major river of southeastern Myanmar (Burma)

== See also ==
- Tanintharyi (disambiguation)
- Burmese–Siamese War (1759–1760), a conflict for control of the Tenasserim region
