= Baulu Taung =

Mountain in Myanmar

- Location within Myanmar

Highest point
- Elevation: 992 m (3,255 ft)
- Coordinates: 12°57′39″N 99°6′7″E

Geography
- Location: Tanintharyi Region, Myanmar
- Parent range: Bilauktaung, Tenasserim Hills

Climbing
- First ascent: unknown
- Easiest route: climb

Baulu Taung is a mountain of the Tenasserim Hills, Burma.

== Geography ==
Baulu Taung is located southeast of Myinmoletkat Taung, the main Bilauktaung peak, in a wooded and largely uninhabited area of the Tanintharyi Region, 9 km to the west of the border with Thailand. The nearest inhabited place is Dathwekyauk, a riverside village located roughly 15 km to the WNW.

== See also ==
- List of mountains in Burma
