= Danio dichromatus =

Scientific classification
- Kingdom: Animalia
- Phylum: Chordata
- Class: Actinopterygii
- Division: Teleostei
- Order: Cypriniformes
- Family: Danionidae
- Genus: Danio
- Species: D. dichromatus

Binomial name
- Danio dichromatus Britz & Kullander, 2024

Species of fish

Danio dichromatus is a species of freshwater ray-finned fish belonging to the family Danionidae. It was first formally described in 2024 by Ralf Britz and Sven O. Kullander with its type locality given as Melaung Chaung, Palaw Township, Tanintharyi Region in Myanmar at 12°45'26"N, 98°44'22". This species was known in the aquarium trade before it was formally described, with the names yellow hikari and blue hikari. This species is known from the drainage systems of the Tanintharyi, Dawei and Lenya rivers in Myanmar.
