= Lenya =

Lenya may refer to:

- Lenya River, a river of Burma
- Lenya National Park, a proposed national park in Burma
- Lenya, a crater on Mars named after the Burmese town
- Lotte Lenya (1898–1981), Austrian-American singer and actress
- Jackie Lenya (1941–2021), English actress
