= Myinmoletkat =

- Village
- Location in Burma
- Coordinates: 13°34′N 98°41′E
- Country: Burma
- Region: Taninthayi Region
- District: Dawei District
- Township: Dawei Township
- Elevation: 478 m (1,568 ft)
- Time zone: UTC+6.30 (MST)

Myinmoletkat is a village of Dawei District in the Taninthayi Division of Myanmar.

== Geography ==
Myinmoletkat is located east of the Ban River on the western side of the Tenasserim Range. 2,072 m high Myinmoletkat Taung, one of the main summits of the Bilauktaung subrange is located 15 km to the southeast of the village.
