= Garra notata =

Conservation status
- Least Concern (IUCN 3.1)

Scientific classification
- Kingdom: Animalia
- Phylum: Chordata
- Class: Actinopterygii
- Order: Cypriniformes
- Family: Cyprinidae
- Subfamily: Labeoninae
- Genus: Garra
- Species: G. notata

Binomial name
- Garra notata (Blyth, 1860)

Synonyms
- Platycara notata Blyth, 1860

Species of fish

Garra notata, the Tenasserim garra, is a species of ray-finned fish in the genus Garra. This species' common name refers to the Tenasserim Hills.

It lives between 120 and 1,500 m (390 and 4,920 ft) ASL in rocky mountain streams, rapid zones and waterfalls of the lower Salween and Great Tenasserim (Tanintharyi) basins in Myanmar, Yunnan (southern China) and water courses adjacent to these regions in western Thailand. This species reaches a maximum length of 100–120 mm (3.9–4.7 in)
