= Tanintharyi =

Tanintharyi may refer to:

- Tanintharyi (town) or Taninthayi (known during the British occupation as Tenasserim), a town in Tanintharyi Township, Myeik District, in the Tanintharyi Region of Burma (Myanmar)
- Tanintharyi Region, formerly Tenasserim Division and Tanintharyi Division, an administrative region of Myanmar
- Tanintharyi Township, a township of Myeik District in the Tanintharyi Region of Myanmar
- Cnemaspis tanintharyi a gecko from Myanmar

== See also ==
- Tenasserim (disambiguation)
