= Tun Lin =

Burmese politician

Member of the Amyotha Hluttaw
- Incumbent
- Assumed office 1 February 2016
- Constituency: Tanintharyi No.3
- Majority: 34266 votes

Personal details
- Born: 6 August 1948 (age 78) Tanintharyi, Burma (Myanmar)
- Party: National League for Democracy
- Spouse: Kyin San
- Parent(s): San Win (father); Khin Hla (mother)
- Education: Yangon University B.Sc(Mats)M.Sc(Q), B.Ed
- Occupation: Politician

Tun Lin (Burmese: ထွန်းလင်း, born 6 August 1948) is a Burmese politician who currently serves as a House of Nationalities member of parliament for Tanintharyi Region No. 3 constituency. He is a member of National League for Democracy.

== Early life ==
Tun was born on 6 August 1948 in Tanintharyi, Burma (Myanmar). He graduated B.Sc(Mats), M.Sc(Q), B.Ed.

== Political career ==
Tun was elected as an Amyotha Hluttaw MP, winning a majority of 34,266 votes, from Tanintharyi Region No. 3 parliamentary constituency.
