= Dawei River =

Coordinates: 13°43′N 98°13′E

Dawei (Tavoy) ထားဝယ်မြစ်
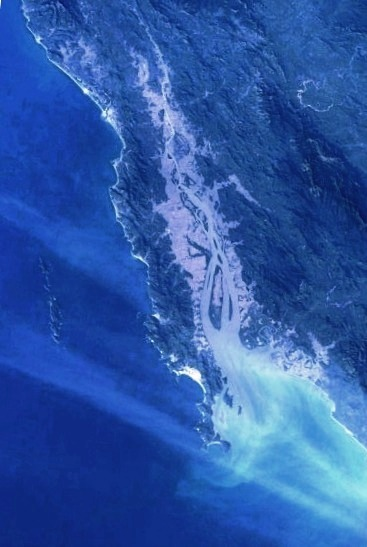
- Mouth of the Dawei (Tavoy) River. The South Moscos Islands can be seen on the left side.

Location
- Country: Tanintharyi Region, Myanmar

Physical characteristics
- Source
  - location: Tenasserim Hills
- Mouth
  - location: Andaman Sea
  - elevation: 0 m (0 ft)

The Dawei River or Tavoy River (Burmese: ထားဝယ်မြစ်) is a river of the Tanintharyi Region, Burma.

== Geography ==
It has its source in the Tenasserim Hills and flows from north to south, the northern branch of the Tenasserim River running parallel to it. It ends in the Andaman Sea coast. In the last stretch of its course it forms a navigable estuary before it meets the sea. Off the shore there are a number of small islands on the western side of the estuarine area.

Dawei (Tavoy) town is located at the head of the estuary by the river at a distance about 40 km from its mouth. The river is 120 miles long.

== See also ==
- List of rivers in Burma
