= Tenasserim Mountain bent-toed gecko =

Scientific classification
- Kingdom: Animalia
- Phylum: Chordata
- Class: Reptilia
- Order: Squamata
- Suborder: Gekkota
- Family: Gekkonidae
- Genus: Cyrtodactylus
- Species: C. payarhtanensis

Binomial name
- Cyrtodactylus payarhtanensis Mulcahy, Thura, & Zug, 2017

Species of lizard

The Tenasserim Mountain bent-toed gecko (Cyrtodactylus payarhtanensis) is a species of gecko that is endemic to the Tenasserim Hills in Myanmar.
