= Lenya National Park =

Proposed national park in Myanmar

- Location within Myanmar
- Location: Bokpyin Township, Tanintharyi Region, Myanmar
- Coordinates: 11°35′00″N 99°19′00″E
- Area: 1,220 mi^{2} (3,200 km^{2})
- Governing body: Myanmar Forest Department

Lenya National Park is a proposed national park in Myanmar. It has been proposed since 2002 to be established in the Tenasserim Hills over an area of 680 mi^{2} (1,800 km^{2}) and extended by 540 mi^{2} (1,400 km^{2}) in 2004. The area comprises evergreen forest at elevations from 50 to 4,078 ft (15 to 1,243 m), which is governed by Myanmar's Forest Department. By 2011, the national park was not yet gazetted and its boundaries still not demarcated.

The endangered Gurney's pitta (Hydrornis gurneyi) was rediscovered in the area of the proposed park in 2003. Large portions of land are being converted to oil palm and timber plantations.

== See also ==
- List of protected areas in Burma
