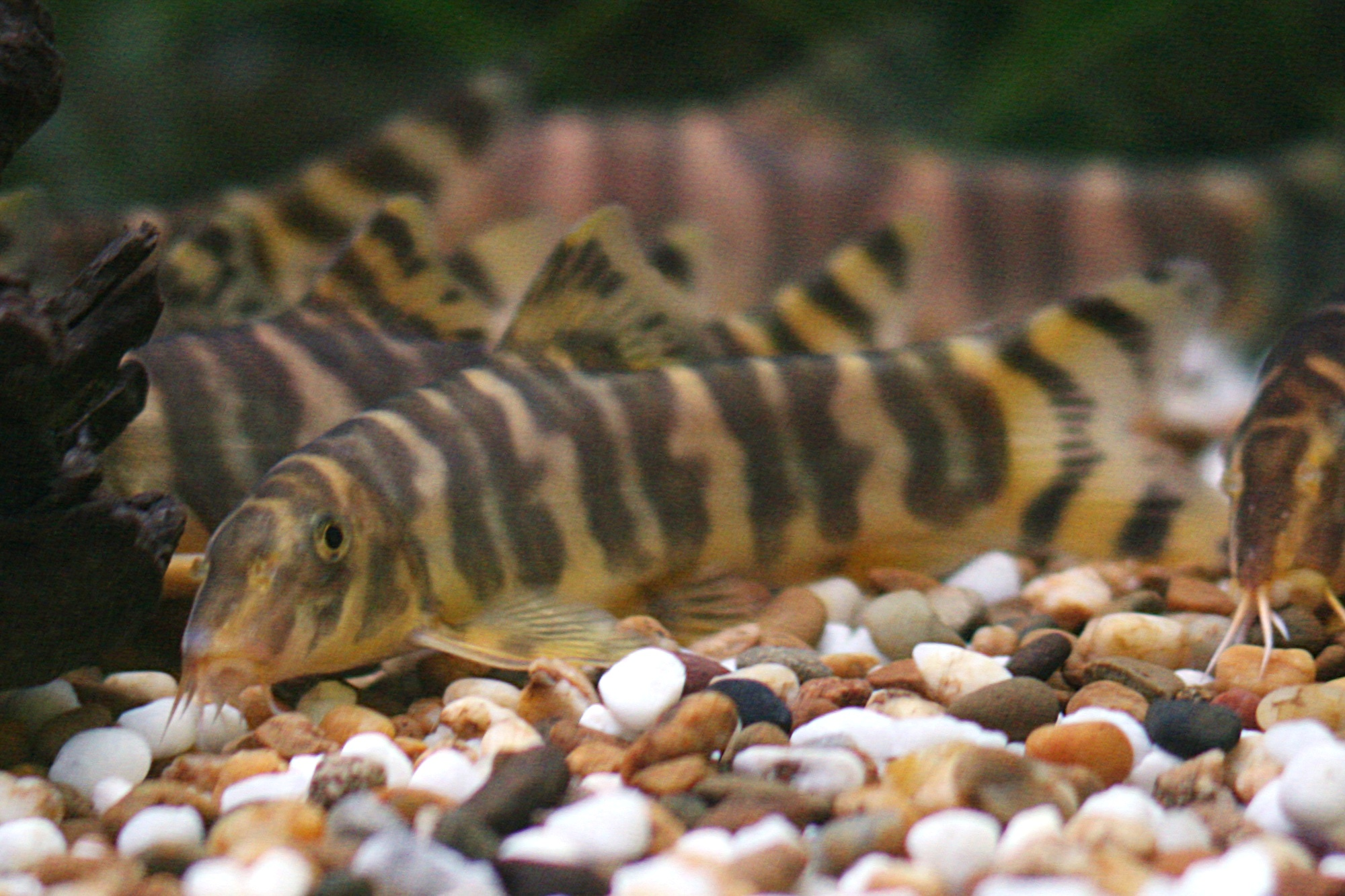

Conservation status
- Data Deficient (IUCN 3.1)

Scientific classification
- Kingdom: Animalia
- Phylum: Chordata
- Class: Actinopterygii
- Order: Cypriniformes
- Family: Botiidae
- Genus: Botia
- Species: B. udomritthiruji

Binomial name
- Botia udomritthiruji H. H. Ng, 2007

= Botia udomritthiruji =

Species of fish

Botia udomritthiruji (emperor loach) is a small freshwater fish in the loach family Botiidae native to the Great Tenasserim (Tanintharyi) River Basin in south Burma. It reaches 13–15 cm (5.1–5.9 in) in length, and the female's abdomen plumper than the abdomen of the male.

This fish species was first caught about 1993 and was identified only relatively recently. It lives in the Tenasserim Hills, in the upper Great Tenasserim River drainage area. It was named after Thai aquarist and fish exporter Kamphol Udomritthiruj. It was described in 2007, being the most recent addition to the genus Botia.

Emperor loaches are peaceful fish suitable to community aquarium tanks. However, they are difficult to obtain because of the inaccessibility of the areas where they live, that is in the Tenasserim range forests where there are almost no roads and most trails are infested by leeches. Unfortunately the area where they live is subject to heavy deforestation owing to illegal logging operations. Formerly there was also insurgency in this section of the hills.
