= Bilauktaung =

Mountain range in Myanmar

- Location within Myanmar

Highest point
- Peak: Myinmoletkat Taung
- Elevation: 2,072 m (6,798 ft)
- Coordinates: 13°28′00″N 98°48′00″E

Geography
- Country: Myanmar
- Parent range: Tenasserim Hills

Geology
- Rock type: granite

Bilauktaung is a subrange of the Tenasserim Hills. It is located in Myanmar on the Myanmar–Thailand border. It extends from the Dawna Range for about 400 km (250 mi) along the frontier area to the Kra Isthmus.

== Geography ==
The Bilauktaung includes Myinmoletkat Taung, with 2,072 m (6,798 ft) the highest point of the northern section of the Tenasserim range, and, with a prominence of 1,857 m (6,093 ft) one of the ultra prominent peaks of Southeast Asia. Other peaks are 1,531 m (5,023 ft) high Ngayanni Kyauk Taung, 1,455 m (4,774 ft) high Palan Taung and 992 m (3,255 ft) high Baulu Taung, among other similarly high summits.

The whole Bilauktaung is sparsely inhabited and covered with thick tropical rain forest. Usually the western mountainsides are more heavily forested than the eastern for they receive heavier monsoon rains.

== See also ==
- List of mountains in Myanmar
