= Myinmoletkat Taung =

Highest point in Tanintharyi Region, Myanmar

- Location within Myanmar

Highest point
- Elevation: 2,072 m (6,798 ft)
- Prominence: 1,857 m (6,093 ft)
- Listing: Ultra; Ribu
- Coordinates: 13°28′00″N 98°48′00″E

Geography
- Location: Tanintharyi Region, Myanmar
- Parent range: Tenasserim Hills

Climbing
- First ascent: unknown
- Easiest route: climb

Myinmoletkat Taung is the highest mountain in Tanintharyi Region, Myanmar. It is located on the Bilauktaung, Tenasserim Hills.

== Geography ==
It is located in the Tanintharyi Region, 15 kilometres (9.3 mi) to the southeast of Myinmoletkat village, 42 kilometres (26 mi) west from the border with Thailand.

With a height of 2,072 metres (6,798 ft) and a prominence of 1,857 metres (6,093 ft), Myinmoletkat Taung is one of the ultra prominent peaks of Southeast Asia.

== See also ==
- List of ultras of Southeast Asia
- List of mountains in Burma
