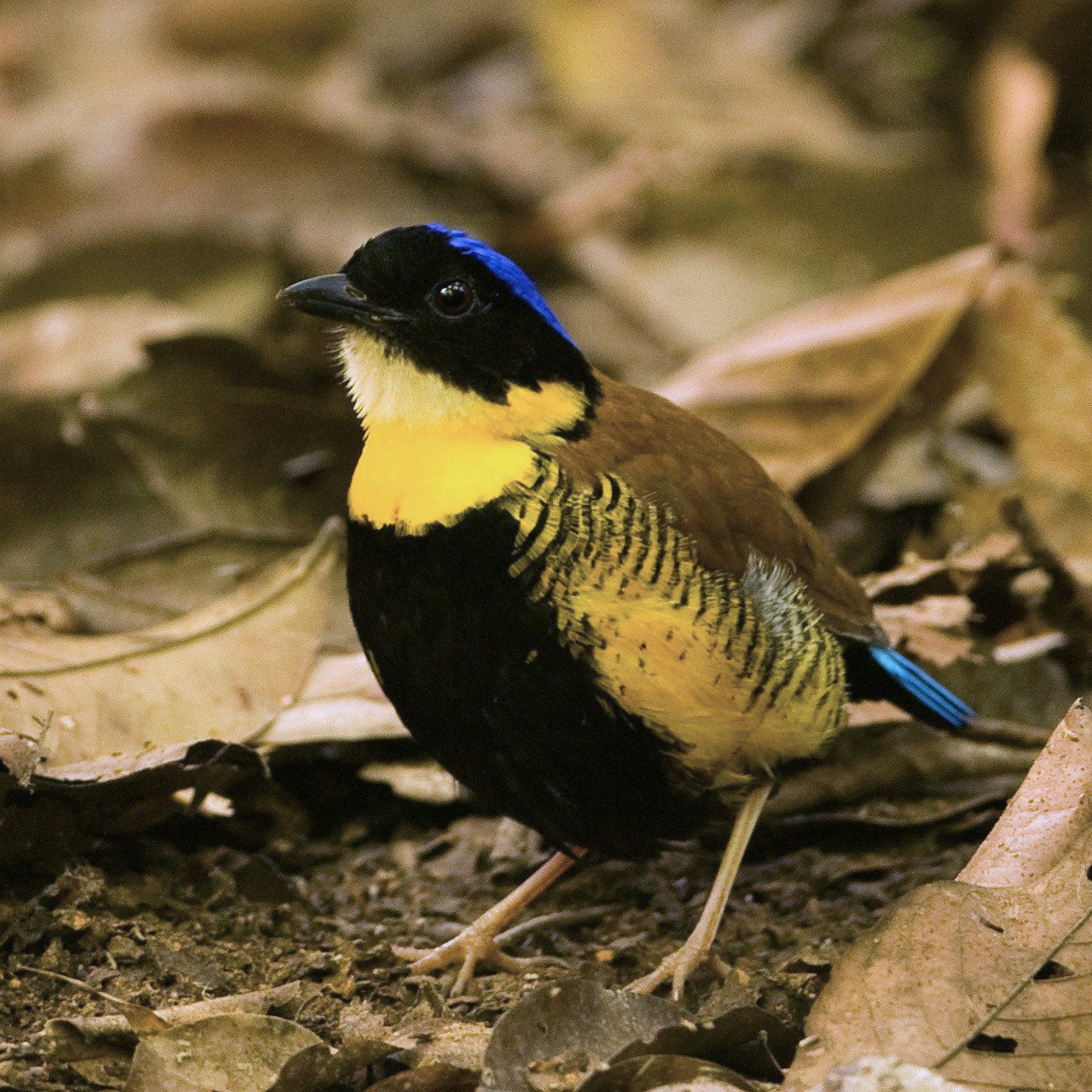
- Male in Khao Nor Chu Chi, Krabi, Thailand

Conservation status
- Critically Endangered (IUCN 3.1)
- CITES Appendix I

Scientific classification
- Kingdom: Animalia
- Phylum: Chordata
- Class: Aves
- Order: Passeriformes
- Family: Pittidae
- Genus: Hydrornis
- Species: H. gurneyi

Binomial name
- Hydrornis gurneyi (Hume, 1875)

Synonyms
- Pitta gurneyi

= Gurney's pitta =

Species of bird

Gurney's pitta (Hydrornis gurneyi) (Thai: นกแต้วแร้วท้องดำ, lit. "black-bellied pitta") is a medium-sized passerine bird. It breeds in the Malay Peninsula, with populations mainly in Myanmar. The common name and Latin binomial commemorate the British banker and amateur ornithologist John Henry Gurney (1819-1890). Its diet consists of slugs, insects, and earthworms.

== Taxonomy ==
Gurney's pitta was described by the amateur ornithologist Allan Octavian Hume in 1875 and given the binomial name Pitta gurneyi. The species was moved to the resurrected genus Hydrornis based on the results of a molecular phylogenetic study published in 2006. The genus Hydrornis had been introduced by the English zoologist Edward Blyth in 1843. The specific epithet was chosen to honour the amateur ornithologist John Henry Gurney (1819-1890).

== Description ==
The Gurney's pitta is a sexually dimorphic species, with the males having brighter and more contrasted colors than the females.

Measurements:

- Length: 21cm(approx. 8in)
- Weight: 57g-86g(approx. 2oz-3oz)

Both male and female birds have a glossy black beak.

The male has a distinct blue crown, yellow throat and black belly, the head has a black mask crossing from the forehead to the nape, the back, from mantle to rump, is a medium brown, and the flank is yellow with many uneven black bars.

The female is much simpler in appearance, with the black mask reaching only from the eye to the nape, with a golden-brown crown as opposed to the male's blue one. The black barred yellow flank of the male is present across the female's entire belly, she has a white throat and shares with the male her blue tail and brown back.

Juvenile birds are dull dark brown with dark yellow striped crown and nape. Breast is streaked. Orange tip on bill.

== Status and conservation ==
Gurney's pitta is critically endangered. It was initially thought to be extinct for some time after 1952, but was rediscovered in 1986. Its rarity has been caused by the clearance of natural forest in southern Burma and peninsular Thailand.

Its population was estimated at a mere nine pairs in 1997, then believed one of the rarest bird species on earth. A search for it in Burma in 2003 was successful and discovered that the species persisted at four sites with a maximum of 10-12 pairs at one location. This granted the species a reassessment from the IUCN, going from critically endangered to endangered. Later on, further research completed in Burma by 2009 provides strong evidence that its global population is much greater than previously estimated, owing to the discovery of several new territories in this country

The pitta was voted the "most wanted bird in Thailand" by bird watchers visiting that country.

A study conducted in 2016, led by scientist Nay Myo Shwe, visited 142 sites the pitta has been previously observed in Myanmar; it was only in 41 that any trace of the bird was found. It was estimated that more than 80% of the bird's habitat was lost from 1999-2017, due to palm oil plantations; the IUCN subsequently re-assessed the species status as critically endangered. The pitta is considered functionally extinct in Thailand.

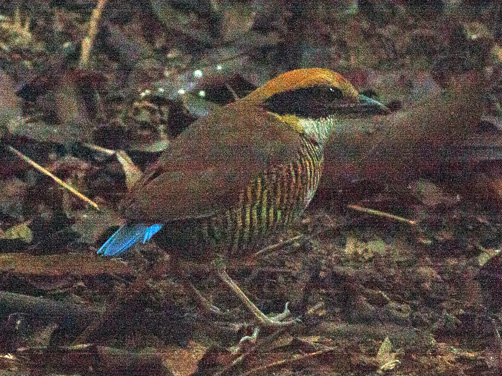
Female in Khao Nor Chu Chi, Krabi, Thailand
