= Tenasserim Hills =

Mountain range in Southeast Asia

- တနင်္သာရီ တောင်တန်း ทิวเขาตะนาวศรี Banjaran Tanah Seri بنجرن تانه سري
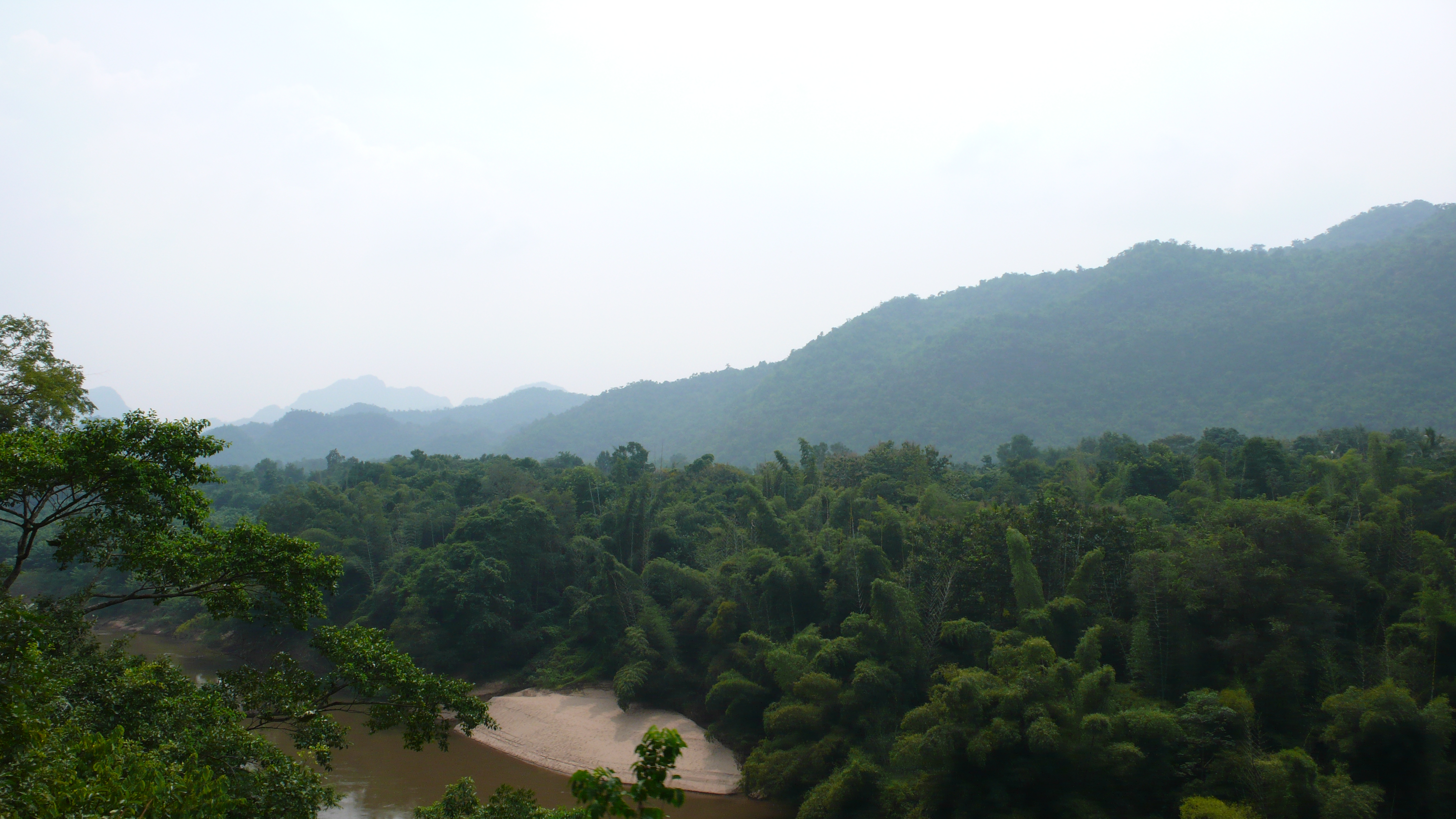
- View from the Burma Railway over the Kwai River, Kanchanaburi province

Highest point
- Peak: Mount Tahan (Malaysia)
- Elevation: 2,187 m (7,175 ft)
- Coordinates: 4°38′00″N 102°14′00″E

Dimensions
- Length: 1,670 km (1,040 mi) N/S
- Width: 130 km (81 mi) E/W

Geography
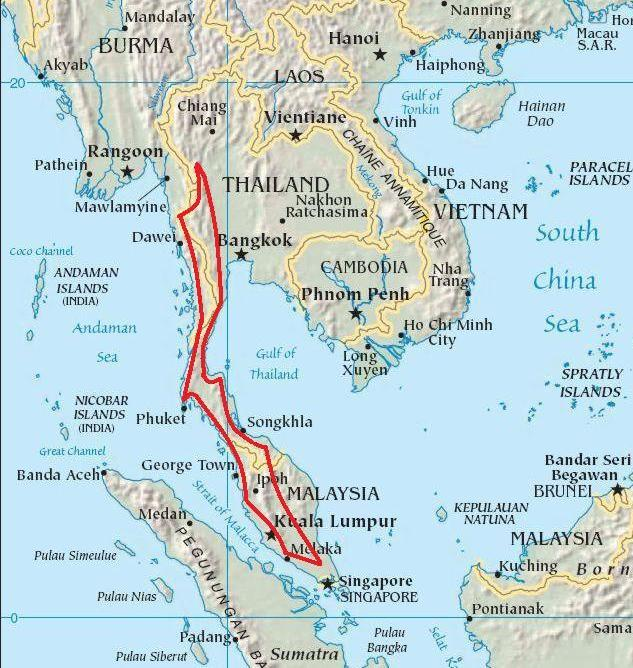
- Extent of the Tenasserim Hills and their subranges
- Countries: Myanmar, Thailand and Malaysia
- Parent range: Indo-Malayan System
- Borders on: Dawna Range, Shan Hills, Thai highlands

Geology
- Rock ages: Permian and Triassic
- Rock types: Granite and Limestone

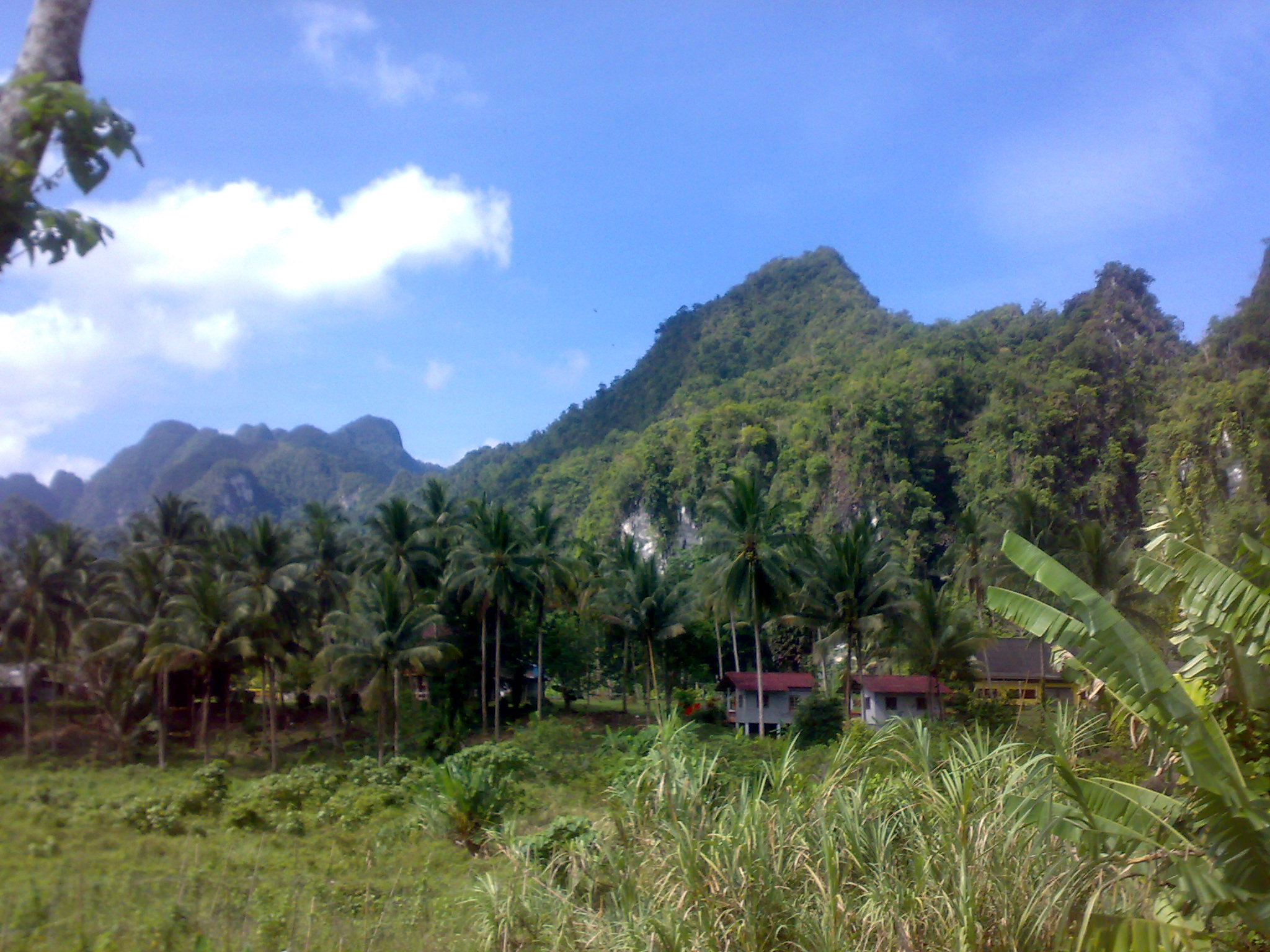
The Khao Sok mountains, Surat Thani, Thailand, towards the southern end of the Tenasserim Range

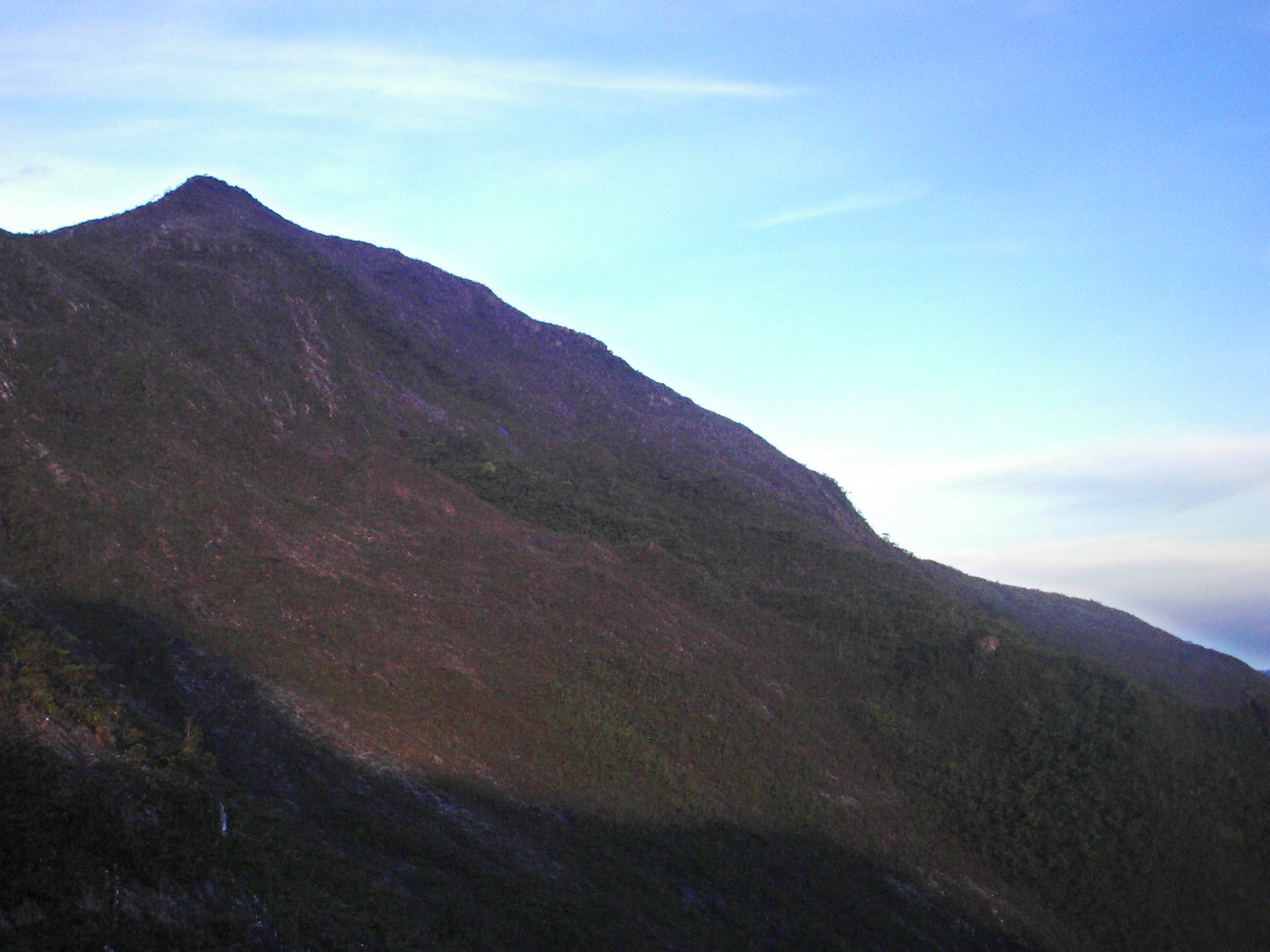
Unnamed Lesser Peak of Mount Tahan in the highest area of the range, Pahang State, Malaysia

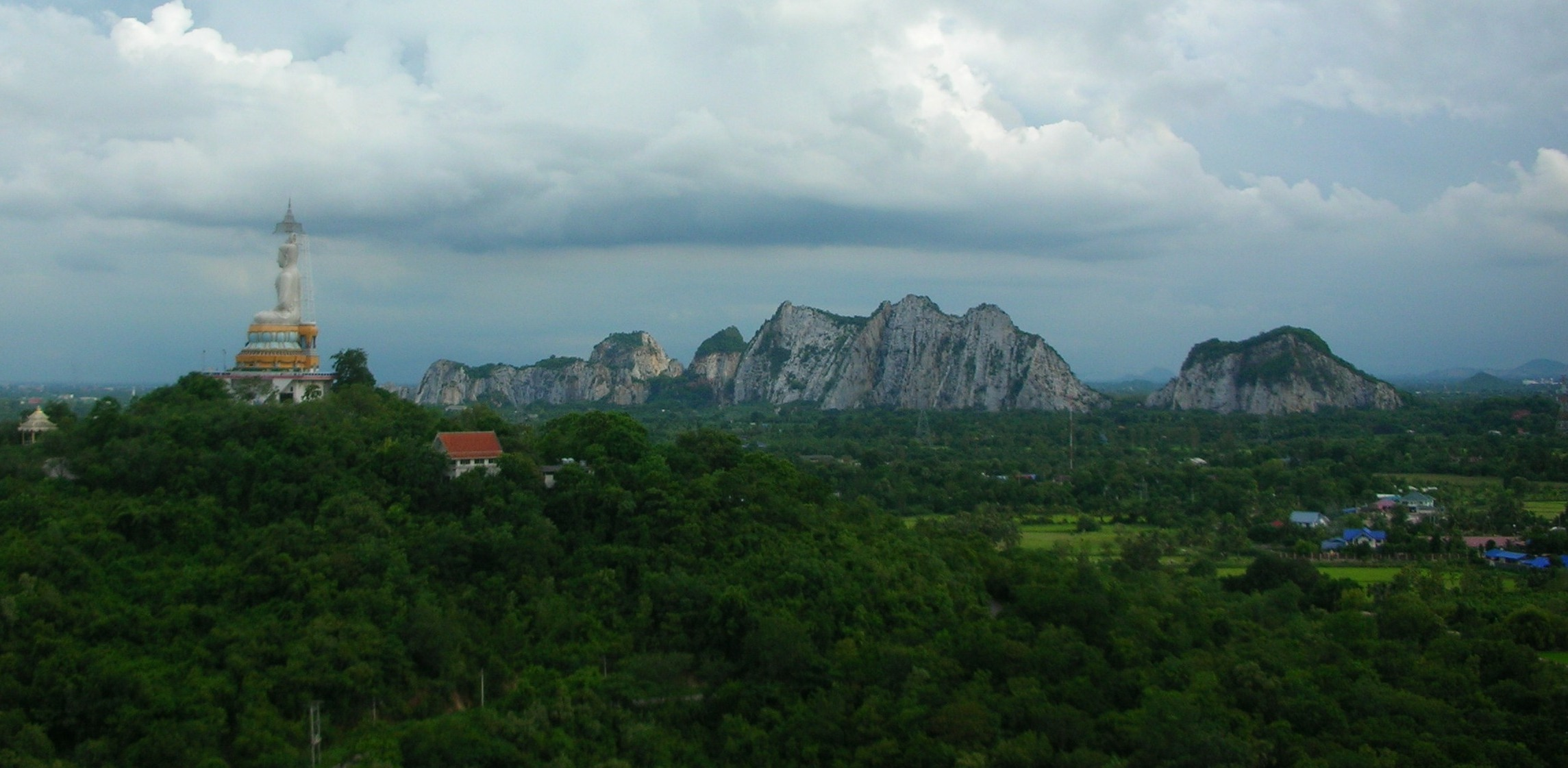
Limestone hills near Wat Nong Hoi, Ratchaburi, Thailand

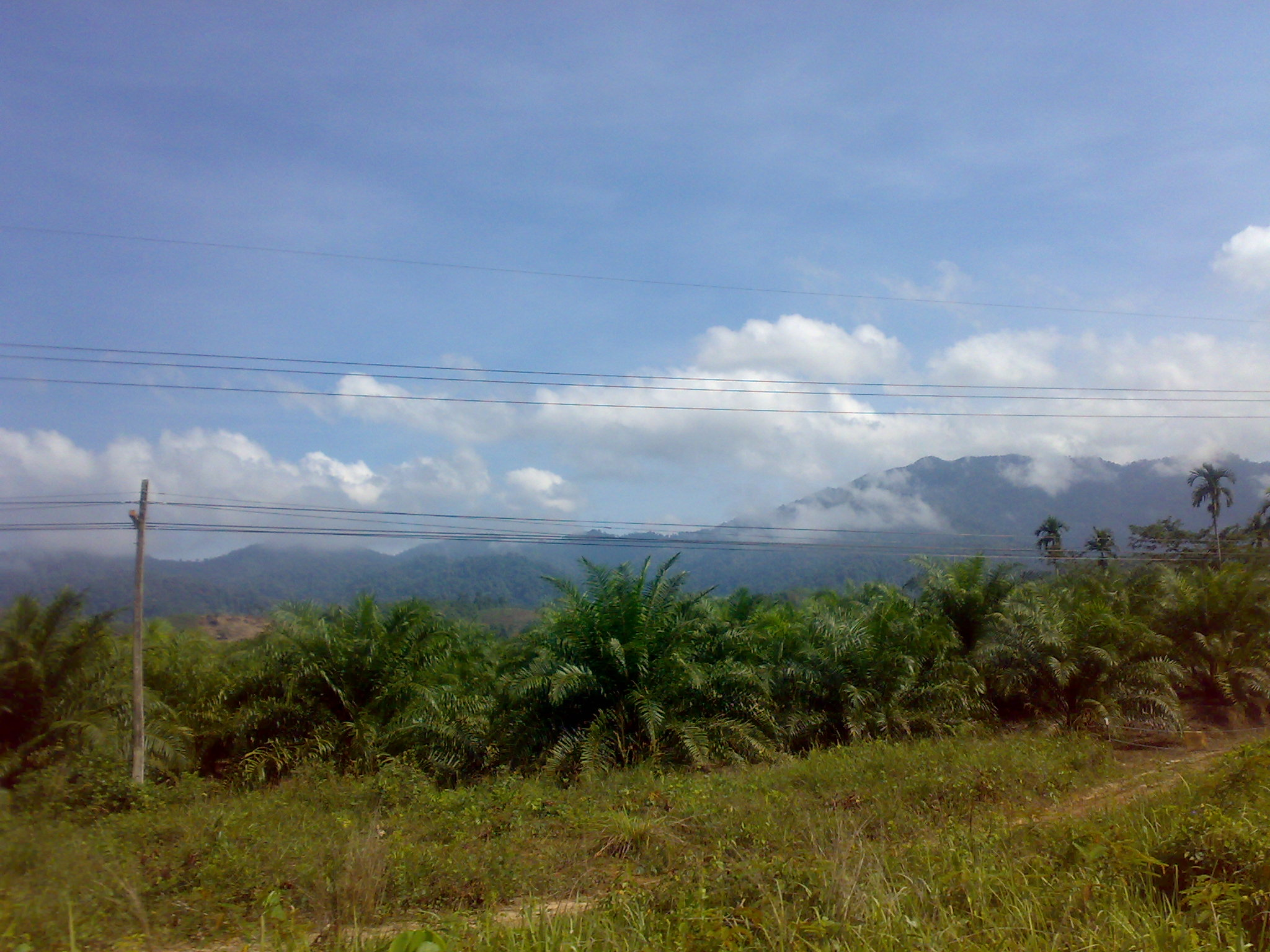
The Tenasserim Hills in Kapong, Phang Nga, Thailand

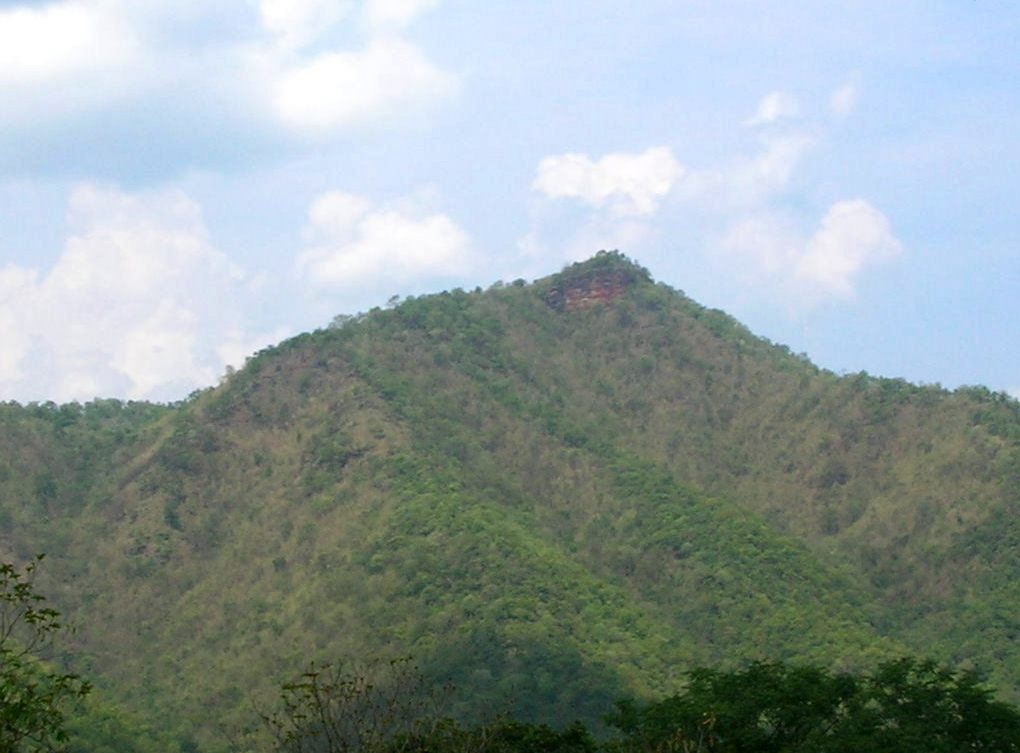
Khao Nom Nang, a breast-shaped hill in Kanchanaburi Province

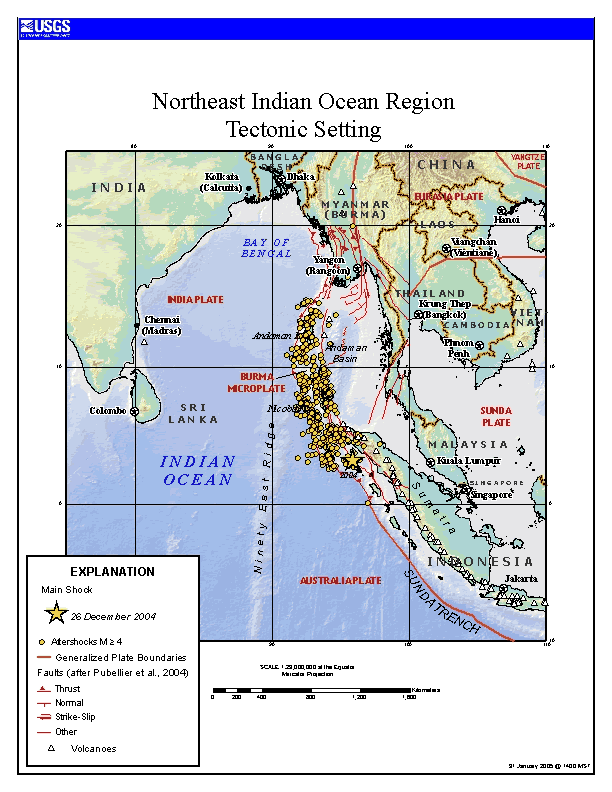
Map of the tectonic setting of the 2004 Indian Ocean earthquake showing the fault lines across the Tenasserim Hills

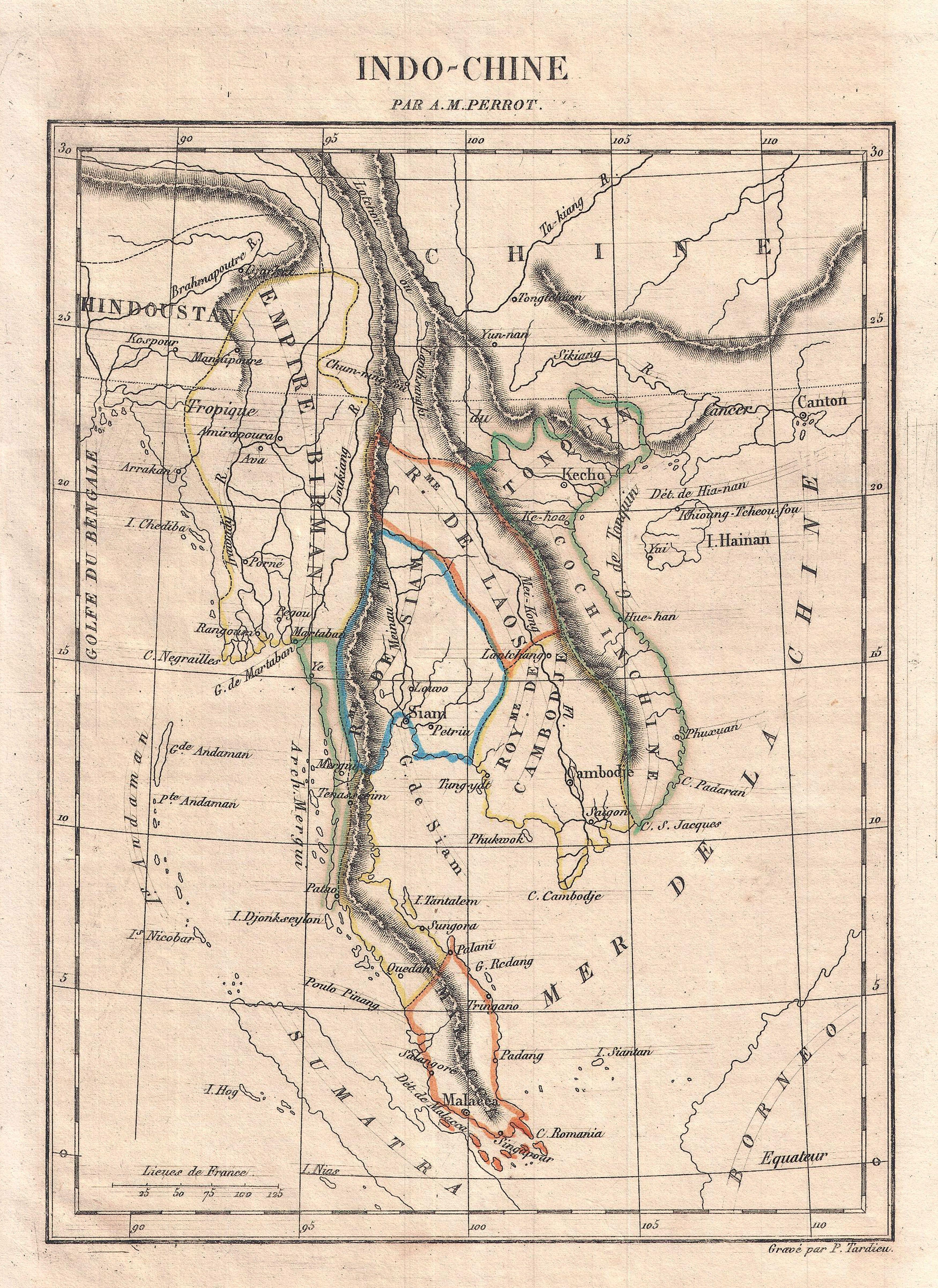
The Tenasserim Hills as represented in an old 19th century map by Aristide Michel Perrot

The Tenasserim Hills or Tenasserim Range (Burmese: တနင်္သာရီ တောင်တန်း, [tənɪ̀ɰ̃θàjì tàʊɰ̃dáɰ̃]; Thai: ทิวเขาตะนาวศรี, RTGS: Thio Khao Tanao Si, pronounced [tʰīw kʰǎw tā.nāːw sǐː]; Malay: Banjaran Tanah Seri/Banjaran Tenang Sari) is the geographical name of a roughly 1,700 km long mountain chain, part of the Indo-Malayan mountain system in Southeast Asia.

Despite their relatively scant altitude these mountains form an effective barrier between Thailand and Myanmar in their northern and central region. There are only two main transnational roads and cross-border points between Kanchanaburi and Tak, at the Three Pagodas Pass and at Mae Sot. The latter is located beyond the northern end of the range, where the Tenasserim Hills meet the Dawna Range. Minor cross-border points are Sing Khon, near Prachuap Khiri Khan, as well as Bong Ti and Phu Nam Ron west of Kanchanaburi. The latter is expected to gain in importance if the planned Dawei Port Project goes ahead, along with a highway and a railway line between Bangkok and that harbor.

The southern section of this extensive chain of mountains runs along the Kra Isthmus into the Malay Peninsula almost reaching Singapore. Many rivers have their source in these mountains, but none of them are very long.

== Etymology ==
This mountain chain is named after the Tenasserim Region (Tanintharyi) in Burma and its name in Thai is Thio Khao Tanaosi, also spelt as Tanawsri, Tanao Sri, Tanaw Sri or in Malay as Tanah Seri. All those names are corrupted form of the original Malay Tanah Seri, which means "glowing land" or from tanah sirih meaning "betel land".

== Geography ==
The Tenasserim Hills are part of a long granite mountain ridge that is older than the Himalayas. Further south from the 16th parallel, the Shan Hills break up into narrow steep-sided ranges, the Dawna Range in the west and, parallel to it at the southern end, the peninsular Tenasserim Mountains that extend southwards along the Kra Isthmus.

Eastwards, in Kanchanaburi province on the Thai side, the mountain range is crossed by the Khwae Yai River and the Khwae Noi River. In this area small hill ridges alternate with narrow valleys that are often only about 2 km wide and further east there are only isolated hills, where the range ends in the Central Plain of Thailand. Further south the Phachi, the Pran Buri and the Phetchaburi River flow eastwards from the range towards the Gulf of Thailand.

The westernmost range is separated from the Tenasserim coast by the Three Pagodas Fault. West of it lie the Dawna Range, the Karen Hills and the valleys of the Salween and the Gyaing. Southwards on the western side, the Ye, Heinze, Dawei (Tavoy), Great Tenasserim (Tanintharyi) and the Lenya rivers are relatively short and flow into the Andaman Sea. Further south the Kraburi River forms the southern border between Thailand and Burma.

=== Sections ===
- Northern: The northern end of the range overlaps with the Dawna Range and is not clearly defined. Some geographic works set the Three Pagodas Pass as the northern limit. The Tenghyo Range is a small northern prolongation following the Andaman Sea coast. The highest points in the northern section of the range are in the Bilauktaung subrange in Myanmar, where 2,072 m high Myinmoletkat Taung is the highest point of the northern section of the Tenasserim range, and with a prominence of 1,857 m one of the ultra-prominent peaks of Southeast Asia as well. Other noteworthy peaks are Ngayannik Yuak Taung 1,531 m and Palan Taung 1,455 m. The average elevations of the Tenasserim Hills are higher on the Burmese side, with many mountain peaks reaching 1,000 m, while on the Thai side the highest summits remain around 600 m save few exceptions.
- Central: The southernmost extension of the Bilauktaung reaches the northern end of the Kra Isthmus. Further south the 1,835 m high Khao Luang (เขาหลวง), located in Nakhon Si Thammarat province, is the tallest mountain in Southern Thailand. In this area the wider range is divided into separate ridges with gaps between them. Some recent geographical works refer to the sections of the Tenasserim Hills in the isthmus as the "Phuket Range" and the "Nakhon Si Thammarat Range". These names are not found, however, in classical geographic sources.
- Southern: The Titiwangsa, Bintang, Tahan and Pantai Timur Ranges form the southern section of the mountain system. The northern part is known as the Sankalakhiri Range, formed by the smaller Pattani, Songkhla and Taluban subranges. The main range runs approximately in a northwest–southeast orientation across the border into Peninsular Malaysia, and forms the backbone of the peninsula, separating the west and east coast regions. The main stretch of the Titiwangsa Mountains cover the states of Kelantan, Pahang, Perak, Selangor and Negeri Sembilan. Foothills extend further southeastwards into Johor, where 1,276 m high Mount Ophir is located. The 2,187 m high Mount Tahan of the Tahan Range and the 2,183 m high Mount Korbu are the highest summits of this stretch and of the whole Tenasserim Range.

== Ecology ==
Great extensions of these hills are covered with dense tropical moist forests. Usually the western slopes are more densely forested than the eastern for they receive more abundant monsoon rains.

The range is home to several distinct ecoregions. The Dawna and other northern ranges are in the Kayah–Karen montane rain forests ecoregion. The Tenasserim–South Thailand semi-evergreen rain forests cover the Bilauktaung range and the Isthmus of Kra, and extend to the coast on both sides of the isthmus. The Kayah-Karen montane rain forests and Tenasserim-South Thailand semi-evergreen forests together form the Kayah–Karen/Tenasserim moist forests ecoregion which is included in the Global 200 list of ecoregions identified by the World Wide Fund for Nature as priorities for conservation.

The Kangar–Pattani floristic boundary runs across the peninsula in southern Thailand and northernmost Malaysia, marking the boundary between the large biogeographic regions of Indochina to the north and Sundaland and Malesia to the south. The forests north of the boundary are characterized by seasonally-deciduous trees, while the Sundaland forests have more year-round rainfall and the trees are mostly evergreen. The ranges in Peninsular Malaysia are part of the Peninsular Malaysian montane rain forests ecoregion.

The Tenasserim Hills form the habitat for a number of endangered species, including the Gurney's pitta, endemic to Thailand and Burma, as well as the Asian elephant and tiger. The Sumatran rhinoceros has been reported in the northern section of the wider range. There are records from the north of Tenasserim proper, where there were numerous reports in 1962, to Kota Tinggi in the south where a rhino was captured in 1994. The Endau-Rompin National Park in Malaysia has the largest remaining Sumatran rhinoceros population in the range.

Other species include the sambar deer, barking deer, serow, red goral, leopard, Kitti's hog-nosed bat, the Tenasserim white-bellied rat and the Tenasserim lutung, as well as a number of bird species and the Tenasserim Mountain bent-toed gecko. Among the fishes in the streams and rivulets of the range the emperor loach and the Tenasserim garra deserve mention.

The Tanintharyi National Park and the Tanintharyi Nature Reserve were established in 2005, and the Lenya National Park was proposed in 2002 and 2004, on the Burmese side in order to implement habitat conservation, but illegal logging driven by greed and corruption is an ongoing problem on both sides of the border. On the Thai side the Kaeng Krachan National Park was demarcated already in 1981, covering parts of the districts of Nong Ya Plong, Kaeng Krachan and Tha Yang of Phetchaburi province, and of Hua Hin of Prachuap Khiri Khan province. The Khao Sam Roi Yot National Park is located in the Khao Sam Roi Yot limestone mountains, a coastal offshoot of the main Tenasserim range and Nam Tok Huay Yang National Park is another park in Prachuap Khiri Khan province that is located on the Thai side by the border area between 100 and 1200 metres above sea level. In Malaysia the main protected areas in the range area are Endau-Rompin National Park, Gunung Ledang National Park, Taman Negara and Selangor State Park.

The killing of wild elephants is a big problem at Kaeng Krachan National Park, with the authorities being unable to control the poachers. Some park officials are allegedly involved in the trade of elephant parts.

== History ==
This range forms a natural border between Burma and Thailand, but it was crossed in 1759 by Burmese troops led by Alaungpaya and his son Hsinbyushin during the Burmese–Siamese War (1759–1760). The Burmese battle plan was to go around the heavily defended Siamese positions along shorter, more direct invasion routes. The invasion force overran relatively thin Siamese defenses in the coast, crossed the Tenasserim Hills to the shore of the Gulf of Siam, and turned north towards Ayutthaya.

In January 1942, at the beginning of the Japanese invasion of Burma, the main body of the Japanese 33d Division began the main attack towards Rangoon westward from Thailand across the Kawkareik Pass in the Tenasserim Range. A road was cut across the mountains by Japanese military engineers, but many infantry units crossed the range on foot in an arduous march through the forests and cliffs. This road was impracticable during the rainy season, when mud and rivulets made advance difficult for the Japanese Infantry and leeches abounded.

Between 1942 and 1943, during the construction of the Burma Railway between Bangkok and Yangon, Hellfire Pass in the Tenasserim Range was a particularly difficult section of the line to build. It was the largest rock cutting on the railway, also known as the "Death Railway", coupled with its general remoteness and the lack of proper construction tools during building. The Australian, British, Dutch, other allied prisoners of war, along with Chinese, Malay and Tamil labourers, were required by the Japanese to complete the cutting of the stretch. 69 men were beaten to death by Japanese and Korean guards in the six weeks it took to build the railway pass, and many more died from cholera, dysentery, starvation, and exhaustion (Wigmore 568).

On 19 July 2011, a Royal Thai Army Sikorsky UH-60 Black Hawk helicopter crashed in these mountains, killing 9. The chopper had been sent out to recover five bodies of victims of another helicopter crash involving a Bell UH-1 Iroquois, that had occurred two days earlier while looking for illegal loggers in Kaeng Krachan National Park near the Burmese border west of Phetchaburi. The Black Hawk helicopter crashed near 978 m high Yage Taung mountain in the Tanintharyi National Park zone in Burma, close to the border with Thailand.

A third helicopter, a Bell 212, also crashed in the same area on Sunday, 25 July a few miles further east close to the Kaeng Krachan Reservoir. Superstitious people blamed the three consecutive crashes on the fact that, according to Thai folklore, the densely forested mountains of the Tenasserim Range have strong guardian spirits.

== See also ==
- Indochinese tiger
- Malayan tiger
- List of ecoregions in Myanmar
- Three Pagodas Pass
- Tenasserim Pine
- Great Tenasserim River
- Western Forest Complex
