= Lenya River =

River in Myanmar

Coordinates: 11°40′N 98°43′E

Lenya or Lehyna River is a river of Burma. The Lenya has its source in the Tenasserim Hills and flows into the Andaman Sea about 45 miles south of where the Great Tenasserim River enters the sea near Myeik (Mergui).

== See also ==
- List of rivers in Burma
