= Great Tenasserim River =

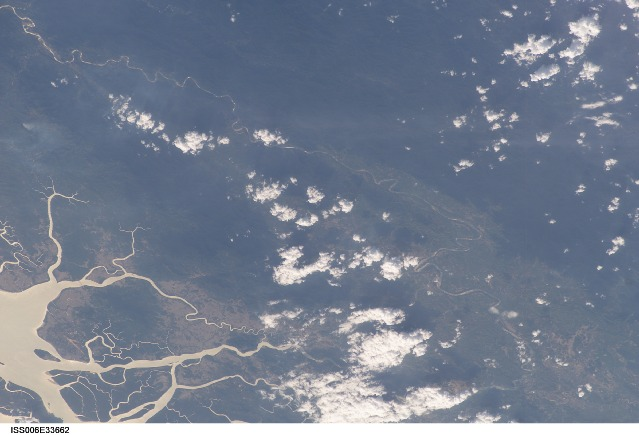
- Great Tenasserim River

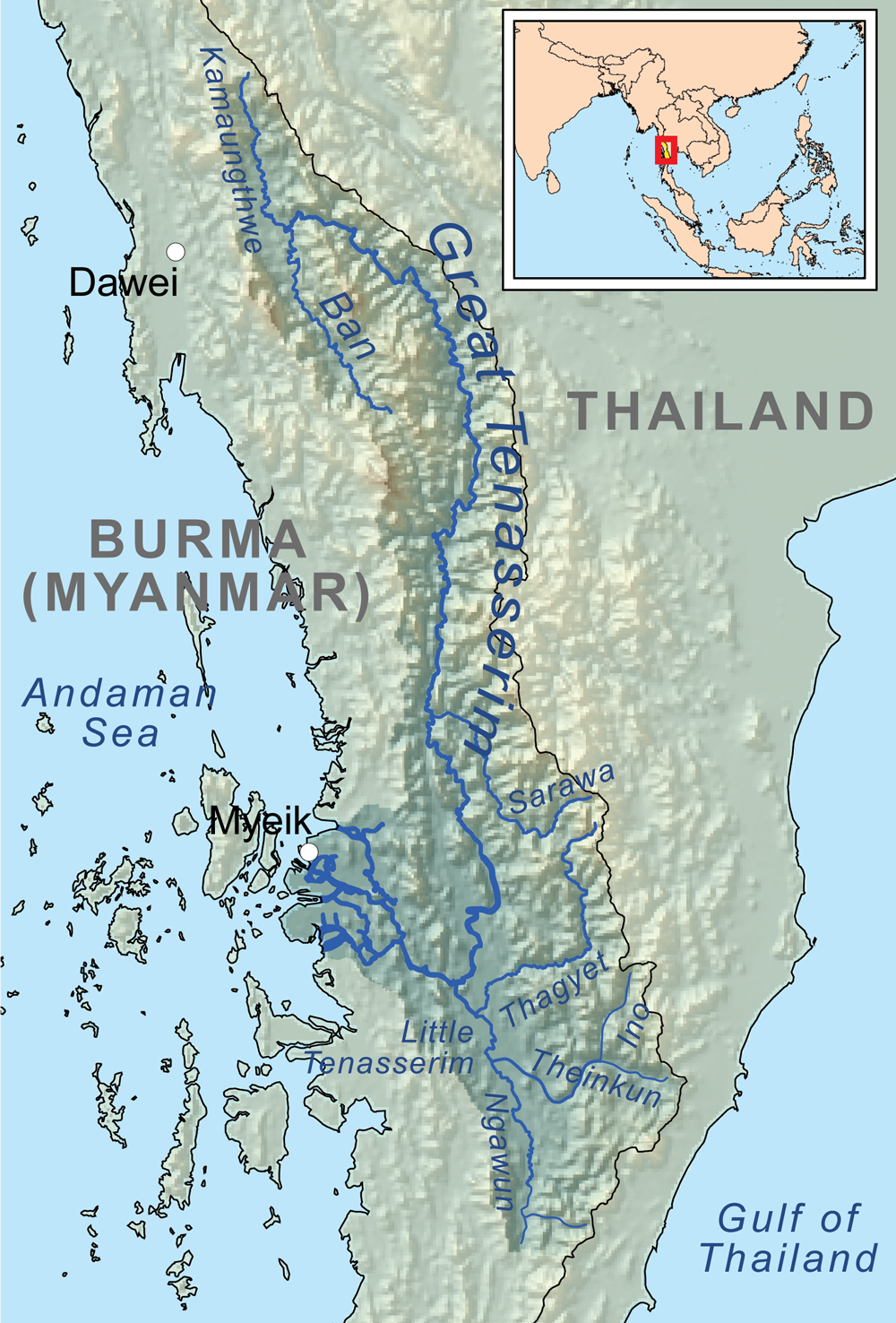

Location
- Country: Burma

Physical characteristics
- Source
  - location: Tenasserim Hills
  - elevation: 2,074 m (6,804 ft)
- Mouth
  - location: Myeik (Mergui), Andaman Sea
  - coordinates: 12°25′36″N 98°35′06″E
  - elevation: 0 m (0 ft)
- Length: 450 km (280 mi)
- Basin size: 19,637 km^{2} (7,582 mi^{2})
- Discharge
  - location: Tanintharyi Delta
  - average: 1,778 m^{3}/s (62,800 cu ft/s)

Basin features
- Progression: Great Tenasserim River
- River system: Andaman Sea
- Tributaries
  - left: Kamaungthwe, Sarawa, Little Tanintharyi
  - right: Ban, Thami, Thar Ra Bwin, Tamok

The Great Tenasserim River or the Tanintharyi River is a major river of southeastern Burma. It flows through the Tanintharyi Region, past the town of Tanintharyi, and enters the sea at Myeik (Mergui). The river rises from the Tenasserim Range at an altitude of 2,074 m (6,804 ft), and flows into the Andaman Sea. The region formed by this river is also known as Tenasserim, or Tanintharyi in Burmese. It is in a constricted coastal region in southeastern Myanmar, which borders Thailand on the east and the Andaman Sea on the west.

While non-indigenous fruit trees and other traces of a large population that once occupied the river banks are evident, the ethnic groups who live in this river valley are the Karens in the west and north, Thais in the south, and Burmans who speak a distinct dialect of Burmese.

== Geography ==
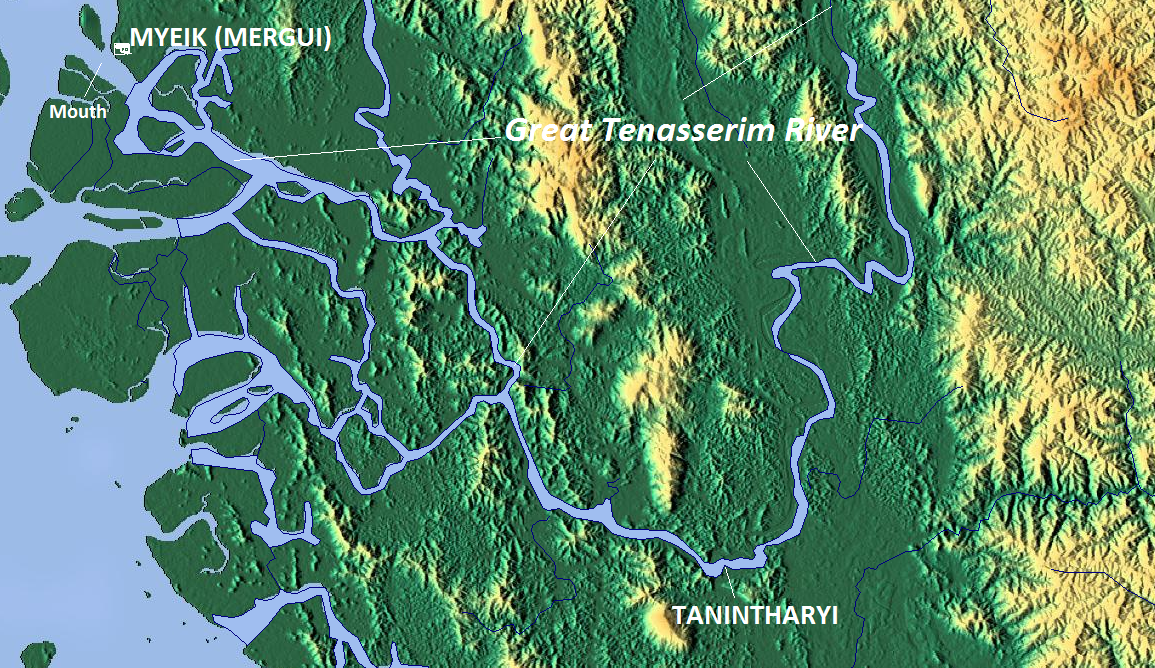
Map of the lower course of the Great Tenasserim River

The Great Tenasserim River is one of the major rivers of southeastern Burma, and the most substantial river running through the Tanintharyi Region. The river is formed at the confluence of the rivers Kamaungthwe and Ban, near Myitta. River Kamaungthwe rises in the Tenasserim Range at a height of 2,074 m (6,804 ft) and the Ban flows from the south. The Myitta River, one of the Tenasserim River's main northern tributaries, joins the Tenasserim from the right northwest of the town of Myitta. After passing by several towns, including Tagu, Banlaw, Wunna, Thamihla, and the right bank towns of Tharapon and Kahan, it reaches Tanintharyi.

Tanintharyi, the capital of the province, is located on the southern bank of the Great Tenasserim, where it is joined by the Little Tenasserim. From here, it flows 33 mi (53 km) before reaching the Andaman Sea at the major seaside town of Myeik (Mergui), situated on a small island that is formed by two branches of the river. These branches constitute the two largest of several mouths of the Great Tenasserim. Myeik is located on the island's peninsula that projects into the Andaman Sea. The river's arrival at the Andaman Sea is 150 mi (240 km) to the south of Dawei, and about 45 mi (72 km) north of where the Lenya River enters the sea. The river delta stretches over a coast line of 20 mi (32 km), with outlet channels of which the navigable channel is 3 mi (4.8 km) south of the town of Mergui at the mouth.

The river banks are characterized as almost perpendicular in some areas. Islands dot the river in the lowland areas. Rapids occur in narrow areas of the channel. The tide is felt 10 mi (16 km) above Tanintharyi. The Tenasserim plains to the north are drained by a series of short rivers and tributaries. The tributaries include Tonbyaw Creek, Thuggoo River, as well as the Hti-phan-ko stream on the Great Tenasserim's right bank. Soil erosion is reported in the upland ridges of the region.

== Tributaries ==
Left tributary	Right tributary	Length (km)	Basin size (km^{2})	Average discharge (m^{3}/s)
Great Tenasserim		450	19,637	1,778
	Tha Moke (Tamok)		267.1	36.1
	Little Tenasserim		5,359.1	262.4
	Thar Ra Bwin		294.2	33.5
Sarawa			1,581.9	128.5
	Thami		347.3	43.2
	Ban		1,890.6	297.6
Kamaungthwe			966.8	150.6

== History ==
In the late 18th century, during the wars on territorial dispute between Myanmar and Thailand, the Great Tenasserim River region came under the control of the Burmese. In the first Anglo-Burmese War (1824–26), British took control of the region. They first occupied Myeik town – the first town of Burma to become a part of British India in 1826. Thereafter, in 1941 during World War II, Japanese occupied the Tenasserim region, and they held Burma from 1941 to 1945. After the war, in 1948, the region became part of independent Burma.

== Economic development ==
The main agricultural operations in the Tenasserim River valley include paddy rice, mostly near Dawei; vegetables, coconuts, rubber, and teak. Salt extraction is also done. Wood and bamboo products are manufactured in Dawei. Fishing in the sea is a major industry at Myeik, with exports of sea fish being of major value to the town's economy. As a result, in the 1990s the town started flourishing with modern buildings. Large boats can navigate the river as far inland as Tanintharyi (Tenasserim Town).

=== Resources ===
The area around the river is rich in manganese. Tin is found in the southern portion of the Tenasserim Region; once extracted it is purified in a plant in Heinda. Tungsten and iron ore mines are found near Dawei and Mergui. Manganese has also been found in the river valley. Tin as a mineral (a dioxide), in the Mergui and Dawei districts of the valley, is extracted from the pebbles found in the river. Pebbles are collected and then washed; the washing process yields 70% tin in the first washing and 75% in the second washing, and the ore thus extracted is said to be very rich and metal produced from this ore is also stated to be of excellent quality. Lead has also been found in the valley at Toungoo, and at the mouth of the river on Maingay Island in the Mergui Archipelago, which is yet to be extracted.

Coal deposits were discovered on the Great Tenasserim around 1838, and five years later, an experimental coal seam was worked. By 1863, indications of coal fields, though not of consequence, were noted on the Great Tenasserim above Tanintharyi, while a 6 ft (1.8 m) bed of crop coal above the Falls of the Great Tenasserim was determined to be of inferior quality and abandoned. Balfour, in 1871, described a principal mine worked about 90 mi (140 km) from the river's mouth and said of the river valley coal that its best parts were considered an improvement over ordinary lignite while equal to bituminous coal's inferior portions. Extensive coal deposits have been found on the river banks. They are concentrated in the river valley about 67 mi (108 km) upstream from the Mergu River mouth. It is in the form of thin beds of shales, sandstones and conglomerates. Its extraction, however, has been limited.

=== Hydroelectric power ===
In 2009, an announcement was made that the Burmese authorities had begun surveying the river for a potential hydroelectric power project along the river, which would generate electricity to be exported to Thailand and Singapore. The first survey of the river for a hydroelectric project was conducted in 2007 by the KNU. The state-run New Light of Myanmar newspaper claimed that a signing ceremony for the Tenasserim Hydropower Project was held on October 9, 2008, between the Burmese Ministry of Electric Power No. 1, the Italian-Thai Development Public Co. Ltd., of Thailand and Singapore's Wind Fall Energy Services Ltd. The Burmese military and Thai officials took water levels in December 2008. A Thai expert had been hired to take water level measurements of the river in different areas in different seasons to assess the best location for a dam. Two possible sites have since been identified for a dam which is expected to generate 600 MW. The first is located in the upper river in the village of Ler Pa Doh, and the second is located in the lower river course near Muro, about three hours apart down the river by boat.

== Fish fauna ==
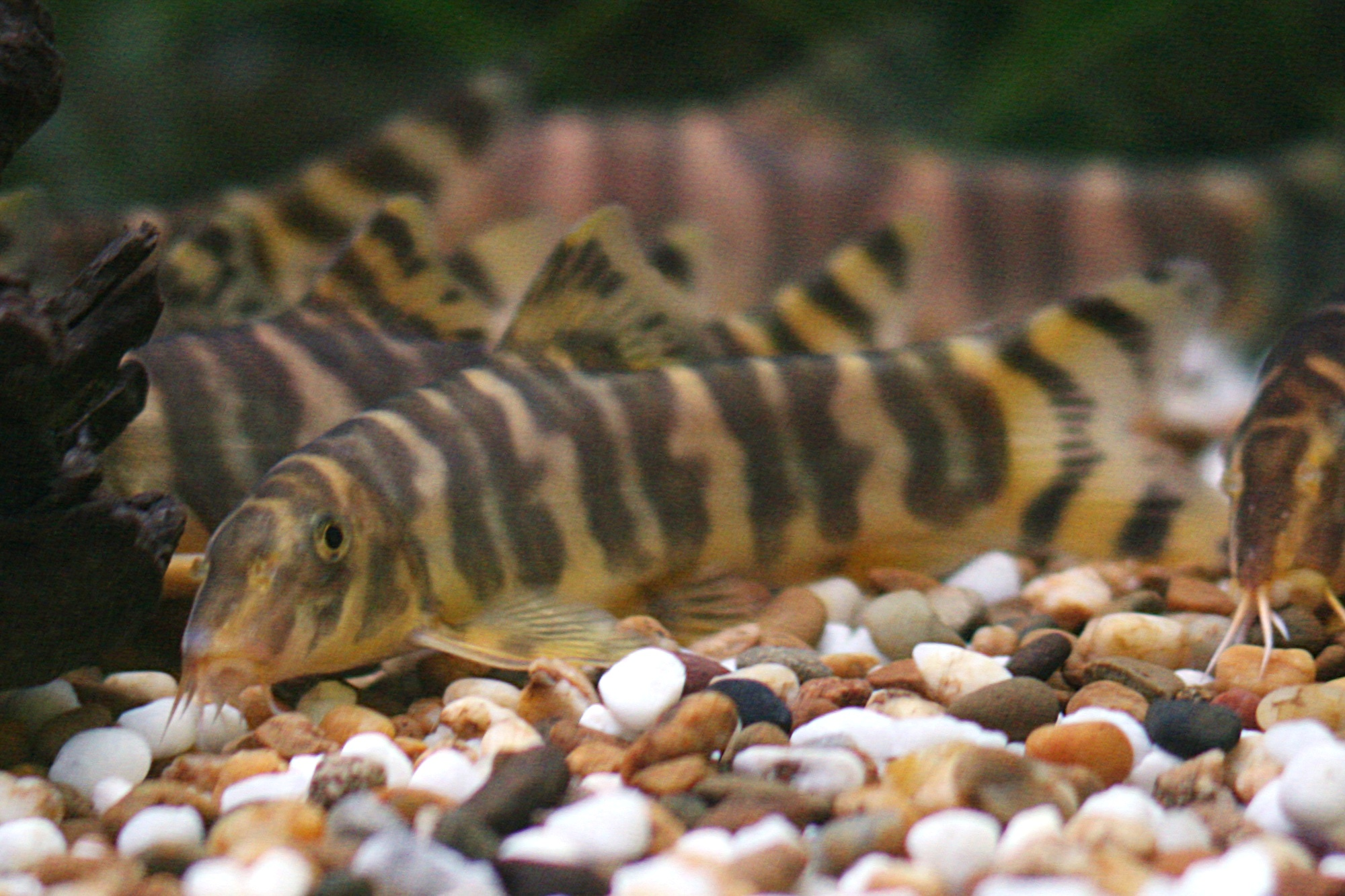
The Emperor loach (Botia udomritthiruji)

A new fish species of the true loaches family was captured for the first time in the Great Tenasserim River in 1993, and was named "Kamphol Udomritthiruj" after the person who found it. It was given the scientific name Botia udomritthiruji, along with the common name Emperor loach. Although it is considered a suitable aquarium fish, the Emperor loach has not been exported from the area due to a serious insurgency problem prevailing in the region.

== See also ==
- List of rivers of Burma
