= Tanintharyi (town) =

Tanintharyi တနင်္သာရီ ဏၚ်ကသဳ
- Town
- Location in Burma
- Coordinates: 12°5′N 99°1′E
- Country: Myanmar
- Region: Tanintharyi Region
- District: Myeik District
- Township: Tanintharyi Township
- Time zone: UTC+6.30 (MMT)

Tanintharyi or Taninthayi (widely known during the British occupation and since as Tenasserim) is a small town in Tanintharyi Township, Myeik District, in the Tanintharyi Region of south-western Myanmar. It is the administrative seat for the township. The town is located on the Great Tenasserim River which eventually enters the sea at Myeik. The town is located at the confluence of this river and a tributary known as the "Little Tenasserim River" which runs south.

The town is built on a hill slope on the site of an ancient city which, for hundreds of years, served as the principal port of Siam. Ethnic Bamars (Burmans) (with Dawei and Myeik subgroups) are the majority community here. The hill people who are non-Buddhists are most numerous here. The majority of the population speak the Tavoyan dialect.

== Etymology ==
The town name has varied, often based on the nationality of the traveller. These variations include Tanaosi or Tannaw (Siamese); Tanah Sari (Malay); Tenanthari, Tanncthaice, Ta-nen-tkd-ri, and Tanang-sci (Burmese); and Ta-na-ssu-li-sen (Chinese). Other sources have referred to it as Thenasserim, Tenáscri, Tciiaçar, Tanater, Tarnassari, Tenazar, Tannzzari, Tanaçari, Tanaçary, Tanaçarim, Taunararin, Tanaçarij, Tcnaiarij, Tanacarim, Tanassarim, Tenassarim, Tenasari, Tanussarin, Tenascri, Dahnnsari, Tanaseri, Tenauri, Tanasserin, Tananarino, Tenassarim, Tenassere, Tanararij, Tanassaria, Tonazarin, and Denouservn.

== History ==
The town's importance as a trade centre depended on it serving as the starting-point on the western coast of Siam as an overland route to the capital, Ayutthaya, which controlled the region during the 15th to 18th centuries. In addition, it was a port at which smaller vessels could unload their cargoes. The town, along with the port cities of Dawei and Myeik, were pivotal to Ayutthaya's Indian Ocean trade.

The town enjoyed a reputation for trade with European nations since the 17th century. In 1759, the Burmese conqueror Alaungpaya invaded the town. He pillaged it the following year and further damaged it in 1765. When Ayutthaya was destroyed in 1767, the town was brought to commercial ruin.

The town fell under British control in the First Anglo-Burmese War in 1824.

== Geography ==
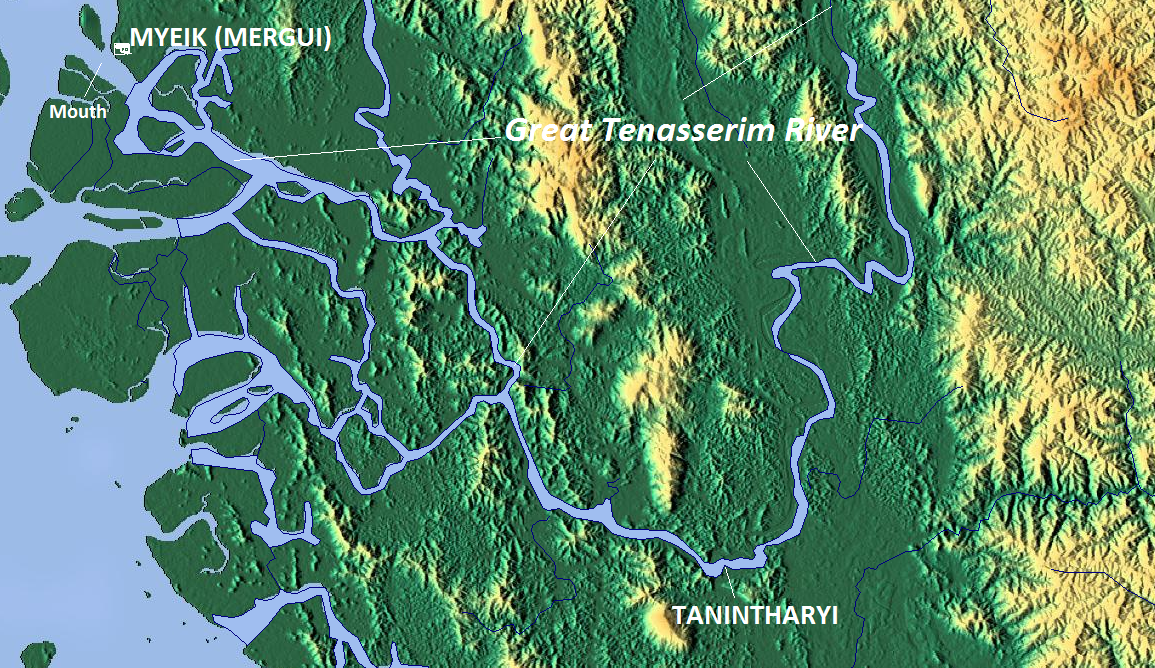
Map showing the town and the river

Tanintharyi lies on the southern bank of the Great Tenasserim River, tucked away into a small peninsula, with the Great Tenasserim River to the north and west and the Little Tenasserim River to the east. Settlements close to Tanintharyi include Kadaw to the west, Mawtone across the river to the north-west and Bangyok to the north-east. It is characterized by a narrow coastal zone flanked by mountains, and is situated between the Gulf of Martaban and Victoria Point, just north of the Equator. The coast land has a long maritime history of trade dealings with the rest of the world, particularly India on the Coromandel coast, Siam and the Middle East.

== Culture ==
Less than a mile from the present village stands and erected by the Siamese at the city's founding in 1383 AD is a large, roughly cut stone pillar weighing several tons which is said to have once been the original city centre. Legend has it that a live woman was thrown into the hole where the pillar was planted and that she became the city's spiritual guardian.

In earlier days, approximately 4 sq mi (10 km^{2}) of the town were surrounded by a brick and mud wall. Though the wall has since been dismantled and the bricks repurposed within other buildings such as the jail, the wall's foundation can still be seen in certain places. Its courthouse was erected on a hill above the village, and this is also the site of two ancient pagodas.

In 1877, the population was approximately 666 inhabitants. As of 1916, the village contained approximately 100 houses.

== Resources ==
The town's agricultural resources include the cultivation of rubber and fruit crops. Pearl farms are also established here by the Ministry of Mines. Tanintharyi is located within the south-east Asian tin zone.
