= List of mountains in Myanmar =

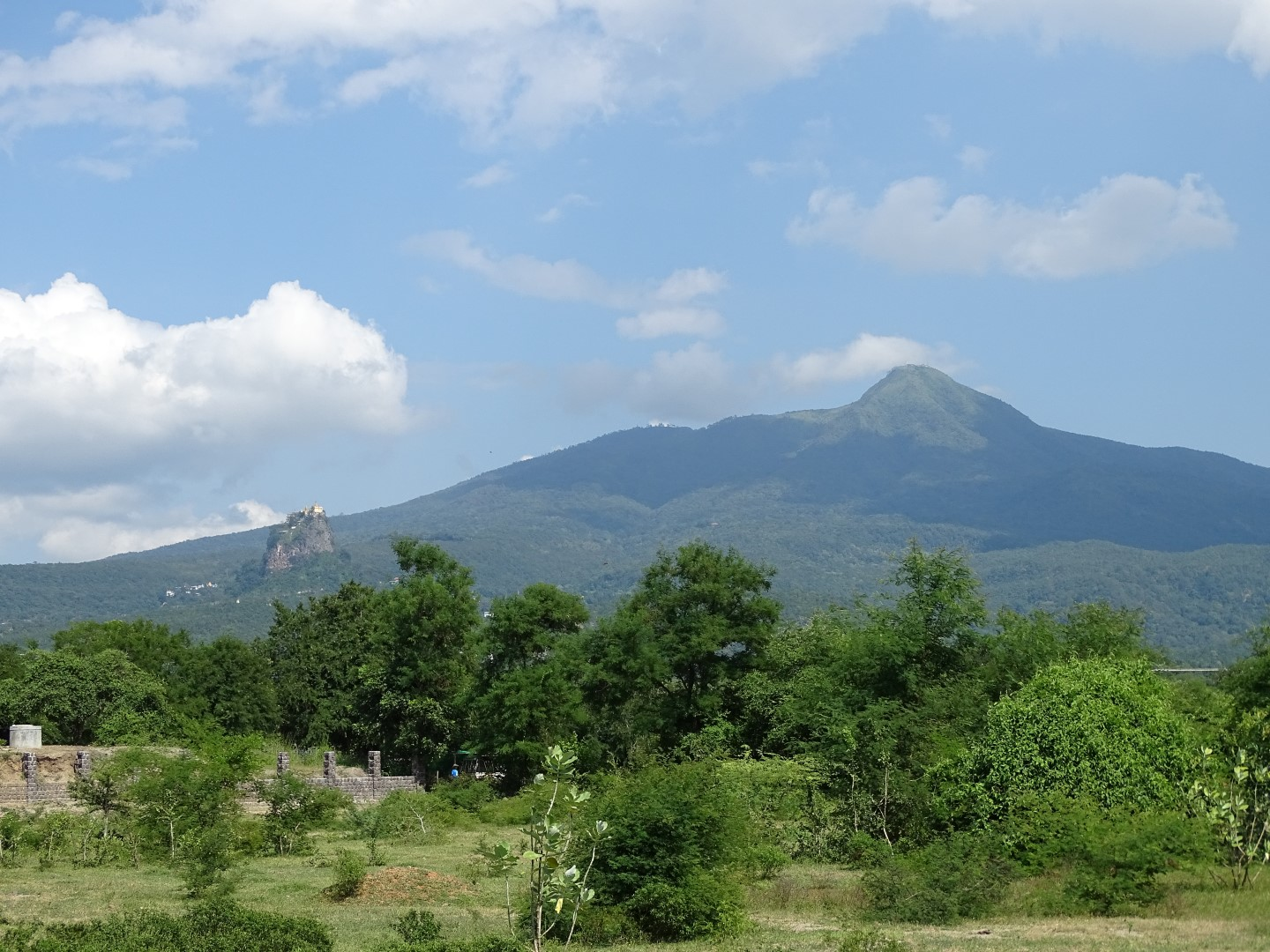
Mount Popa.

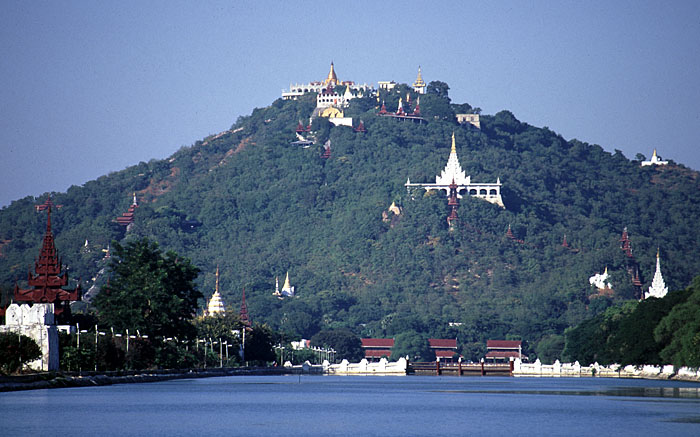
Mandalay Hill.

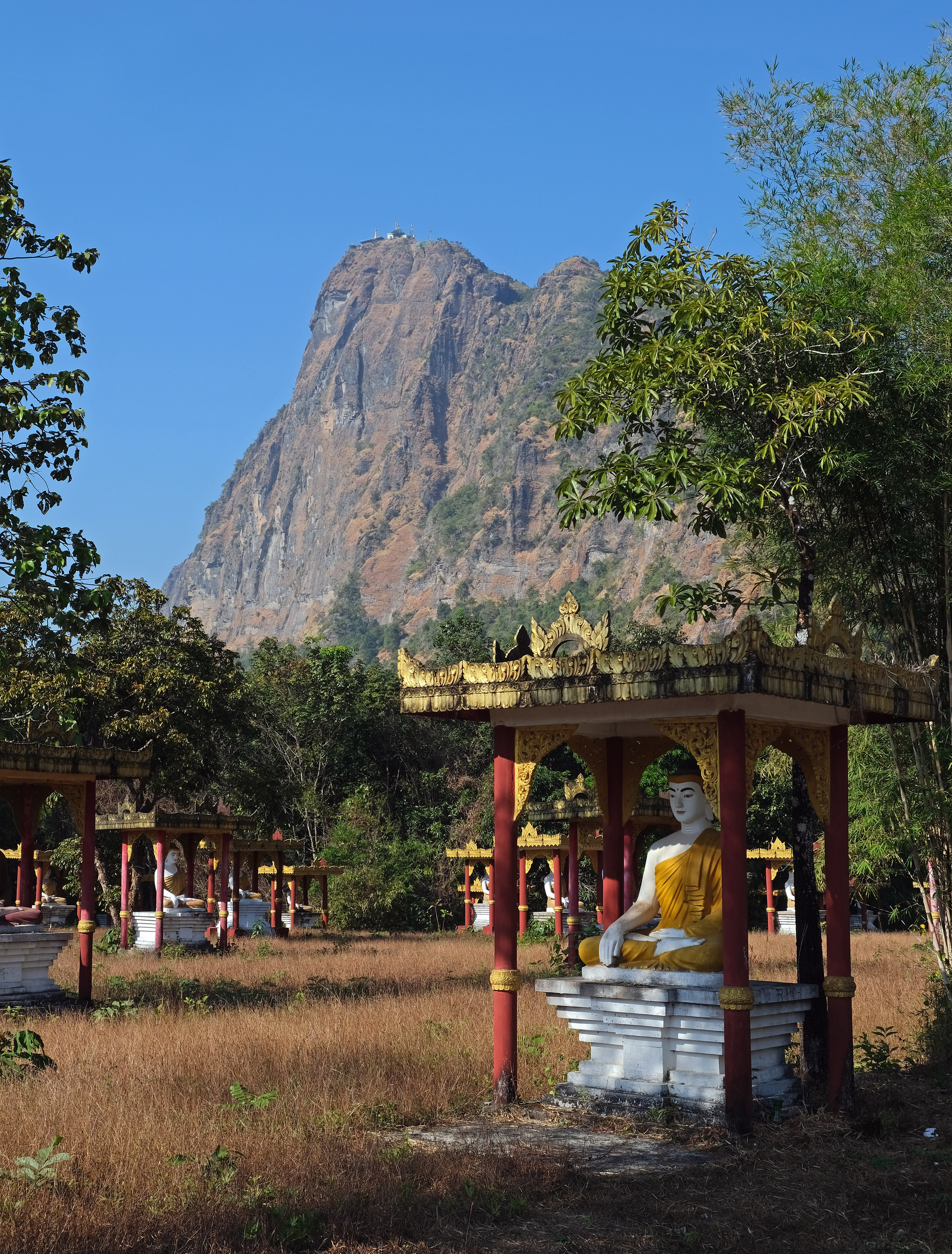
Mount Zwegabin.

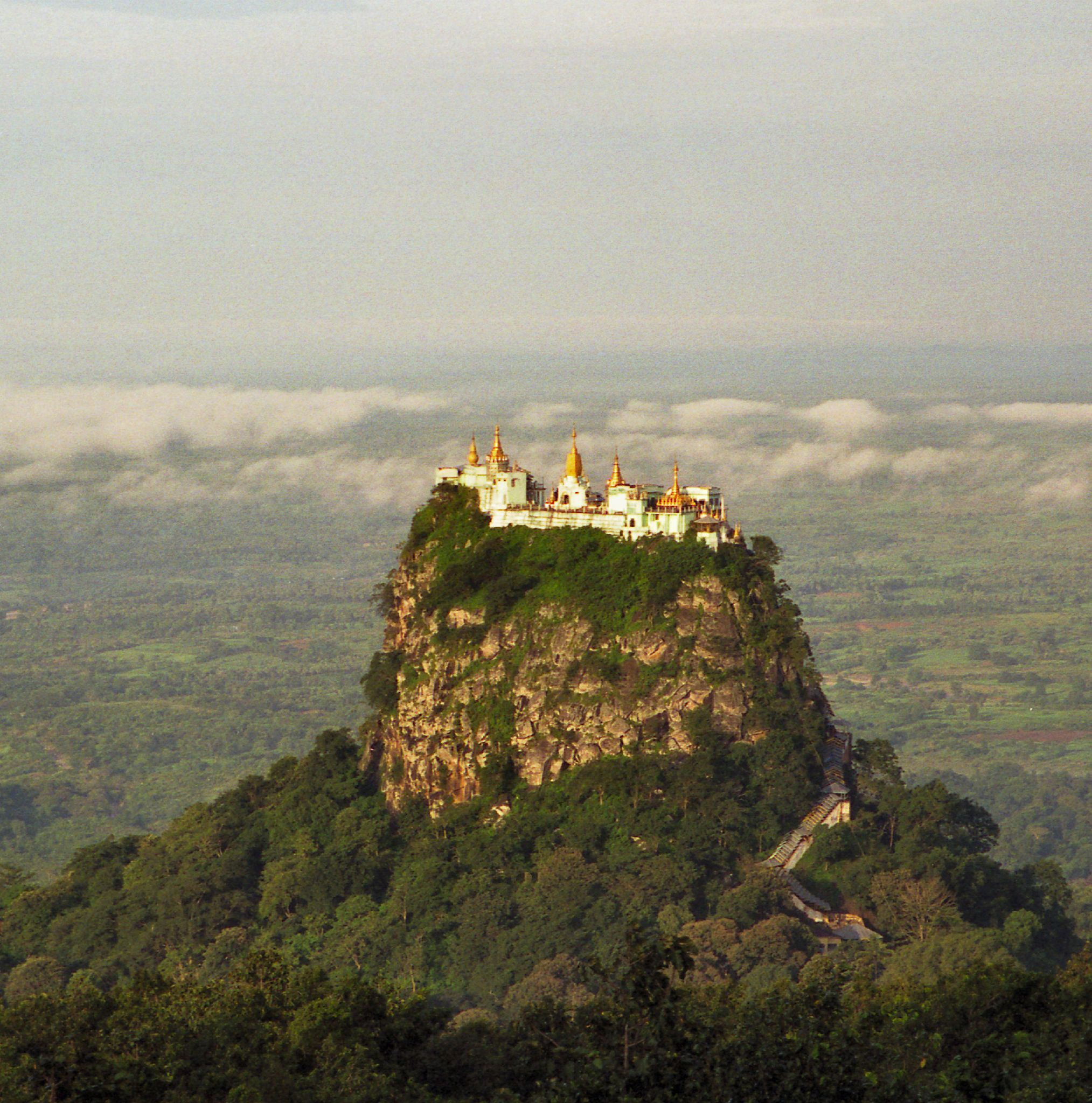
The shrine at the top of Mt. Taung Kalat near Mount Popa.

The following is a list of mountains in Myanmar (Burma). The elevations are in metres. For the names of the mountains in the Latin script the most common transcription has been adopted.

Note:

Many mountains in the country are important not because of their height, but because of their symbolic and cultural significance. Some mountains have Buddhist worship places on top. Since the order of height is convenient, the list follows this order, without in any way intending to diminish or promote the importance of any particular mountain.

== List ==
=== Above 5000 m ===
- Hkakabo Razi, 5,881 m (Highest point in Myanmar and in Southeast Asia Countries) (Disputed)
- Gamlang Razi, 5,870 m
- Peak 5710, 5,710 m
- Dindaw Razi, 5,464 m
- Peak 5412 m,5,411 m
- Peak 5310 m, 5,309 m
- Peak 5224 m, 5,223 m
- Peak 5219 m, 5,218 m
- Peak 5188 m, 5,187 m
- Peak 5127 m, 5,126 m
- Peak 5127 m, 5,126 m
- Peak 5111 m, 5,110 m
- Peak 5110 m, 5,109 m
- Tami Razi, 5,101 m
- Peak 5086 m, 5,085 m
- Peak 5081 m, 5,080 m
- Peak 5081 m, 5,080 m
- Peak 5027 m, 5,026 m

=== Above 4000 m ===
- Peak 4974 m, 4,973 m
- Peak 4964 m, 4,963 m
- Peak 4954 m, 4,953 m
- Peak 4941 m, 4,940 m
- Peak 4890 m, 4,889 m
- Peak 4823 m, 4,822 m
- Tasudo Razi, 4,841 m
- Peak 4812 m, 4,811 m
- Peak 4775 m, 4,774 m
- Peak 4771 m, 4,770 m
- Peak 4694 m, 4,693 m
- Peak 4661 m, 4,660 m
- Peak 4648 m, 4,647 m
- Romaing Razi, 4,623 m
- Madoi Razi, 4,616 m
- Tani Razi, 4,580 m
- Peak 4550 m, 4,549 m
- Peak 4510 m, 4,509 m
- Peak 4402 m, 4,401 m
- [[Peak 4382 m]], 4,382 m
- Peak 4381 m, 4,381 m
- Phangran Razi, 4,328 m
- Peak 4324 m, 4,323 m
- Noi Madwe, 4,319 m
- Peak 4311 m, 4,310 m
- Phonyin Razi, 4,282 m
- Peak 4271 m, 4,270 m
- Masinsang Razi, 4,269 m
- Tasnu Hpawng, 4,196 m
- Khambi Madin, 4,176 m
- shan feng, 4,140 m
- Peak 4031 m, 4,030 m
- Taungnyo Taung, 4,163 m

=== Above 3000 m ===
- Peak 3974 m, 3,973 m
- Phongam, 3,949 m
- Pumtang Razi, 3,880 m
- Peak 3850 m, 3,849 m
- peak, 3,848 m
- Peak 3840 m, 3,839 m
- Moe Hti Taung, 3835 m
- Saramati, 3,826 m (Ultra —highest summit of the Patkai Range)
- Imaw Bum, 3,810 m
- Peak 3803 m, 3,802 m
- Peak 3786 m, 3,785 m
- Marum Razi, 3,781 m
- Peak 3781 m, 3,780 m
- peak 3761 m, 3,761 m
- Hpalahap, 3,748 m
- Peak 3715 m, 3,714 m
- Tasudo Razi, 3,711 m
- Hkaru Bum, 3,677 m (Ultra)
- Longlin Mahku, 3,673 m
- Peak 3650 m, 3,649 m
- Kritaw Razi, 3,644 m
- Phongan Razi, 3,606 m
- Peak 3574 m, 3,573 m
- Azimatap Razi, 3,568 m
- Sajyang Bum, 3,563 m
- Lahku Bum, 3,556 m
- Peak 3554 m, 3,553 m
- Nikhu Razi, 3,548 m
- Daju Razi, 3,547 m
- Saunghkaw Razi, 3,515 m
- Sarang Madin, 3,463 m
- Hpaimai Razi, 3,443 m
- Pasaung Razi, 3,442 m
- Agang Razi, 3,425 m
- Bumhpa Bum, 3,411 m (Ultra —highest summit of the Kachin Hills)
- Sin Razi, 3,394 m
- Hkangri Bum, 3,388 m
- Hkora Razi, 3,381 m
- Hpogahto Bum, 3,374 m
- Damwang Razi, 3,368 m
- Shamoho Shan, 3,354 m
- Tawlang Mahku, 3,349 m
- Htowadi Razi, 3,347 m
- Tachi Pum, 3,341 m
- Wahao Pam, 3,341 m
- Peak 3333 m, 3,332 m
- Shan-ngaw Bum (Shan-ngaw Range), 3,328 m
- Sanka Bum, 3,308 m
- Lawang Kumti, 3,307 m
- Kyum Pam, 3,300 m
- Peak 3298 m, 3,297 m
- Noi Mehong, 3,297 m
- Panshung Razi, 3,297 m
- Peak 3270 m, 3,269 m
- Wachet Razi, 3,250 m
- Mataungse Kyein, 3,241 m
- Awk Pum, 3,232 m
- Tarangsha, 3,228 m
- Langhtam Razi, 3,221 m
- Tsache Pam, 3,220 m
- Peak 3195 m, 3,194 m
- Shazing, 3,189 m
- Baza Razi, 3,186 m
- Htanam Razi, 3,176 m
- Hpangran Madin, 3,163 m
- Nin-gun Bum, 3,162 m
- Ngasong Hpawng, 3,155 m
- Tagulam Bum, 3,148 m
- Che-ngaw Bum, 3,135 m
- Peak 3124 m, 3,123 m
- Mol Len, 3,088 m
- Tzu-mei Shan, 3,087 m
- Abawm Bum, 3,082 m
- Nai Madin, 3,081 m
- Peak 3079 m, 3,078 m
- Hkyaikmaw Bum, 3,069 m
- Sahton Bum, 3,069 m
- Nat Ma Taung, 3,053 m (Ultra —highest summit of the Arakan/Chin Hills)
- Hsaochaw Bum, 3,017 m
- Kalu Htaru, 3,015 m
- Loisaw Bum, 3,014 m
- Peak 3014 m, 3,013 m
- Lungkru Madin, 3,011 m

=== Above 2000 m ===
- Shawngshan Bum, 2,924 m
- Kahtaung Bam, 2,890 m
- Kawngjawng Madin, 2,829 m
- Hkawk Bam, 2,822 m
- Namnenglong Madin, 2,775 m
- Wapawnaung Bum, 2,769 m
- Kanikana Bum, 2,742 m
- Kennedy Peak, 2,703 m (Ultra)
- Sapa Bum, 2,702 m
- Sangpang Bum, 2,692 m (Ultra)
- Zinghmuh, 2,686 m
- Longadang Bum, 2,680 m
- Tamihkat Razi, 2,678 m
- Loi Leng, 2,673 m (Ultra —highest summit of the Shan Hills)
- Mong Ling Shan, 2,641 m
- Nattaung, 2,623 m (Ultra —highest summit of the Karen Hills)
- Kang Mual, 2,587 m
- Leen Nupa, 2,572 m
- Hkamon Bum, 2,566 m
- Loi Pangnao, 2,563 m (Ultra —highest peak of the Daen Lao Range)
- Shingrup Bum, 2,555 m
- Senam Bum, 2,543 m
- Point 2519, 2,519 m (Ultra)
- Zungon Razi, 2,510 m
- Kayunghang Bum, 2,495 m
- Mpang-in Lung Yawng, 2,404 m
- Suanglangsu Vum, 2,399 m
- Nakthar Razi, 2,353 m
- Loi Hsamhsao, 2,325 m
- Sosiso, 2,237 m
- Noi Hkam, 2,244 m
- Loi Pemong, 2,239 m
- Loi Panglom, 2,226 m
- Kakma Bum, 2,225 m
- Singhum Vum, 2,218 m
- Loi Mi, 2,201 m
- Mayu Taung Tan, 2174 m
- Tanghku Bum, 2,150 m
- Htangmok Madin, 2,146 m
- Loi Lan, 2,131 m
- Chikachi Bum, 2,128 m
- Loi Hsong, 2,108 m
- Loi Katwo, 2,102 m
- Mela Taung, 2,080 m (Ultra —highest summit of the Dawna Range)
- Myinmoletkat Taung, 2,072 m (Ultra —highest summit of the Bilauktaung)
- Sialam Vum, 2,029 m
- Loi Pangte, 2,024 m
- Mulayit Taung, 2,005 m
- Loi Pan, 2,003 m

=== Above 1000 m ===
- Long Ku, 1,997 m
- Long Si, 1,997 m
- Loi Hkilek, 1,973 m
- Mairu Madin, 1,964 m
- Loi Lam, 1,939 m
- Nawnghoi, 1,936 m
- Loi Saw, 1,924 m
- Loi Hpa-tan, 1,922 m
- Byingye Taung, 1,890 m
- Mawhpung Bum, 1,874 m (Ultra)
- Noidun Madin, 1,834 m
- Kwahtang, 1,833 m
- Loi Wengwo, 1,831 m
- Loi Un-awm, 1,816 m
- Kodoko, 1,816 m
- Nangle Vum, 1,813 m
- Tinyu Taung, 1,805 m
- Buangpitu Tang, 1,784 m
- Loi Saw, 1,780 m
- Naupau Pum, 1,767 m
- Noi Tang, 1,721 m
- Sharong Bum, 1,703 m
- Loi Hpaye, 1,699 m
- Dakham Madin, 1,691 m
- Loi Hu-li, 1,687 m
- Taungthonton, 1680 m
- Loi Pa-ta, 1,637 m
- Mekot Vum, 1,612 m
- Loi Longlōng, 1,595 m
- Yado Taung, 1,538 m
- Pethukun, 1,519 m
- Mount Popa, 1,518 m (highest summit of the Pegu Range)
- Palan Taung, 1,431 m
- Taunghawele Taung, 1,421 m
- Khawhma Taung, 1,409 m
- Hinhpaik Taung, 1,392 m
- Loi Lai, 1,389 m
- Mount Pinpet, 1,379 m
- Toktaing Taung, 1,367 m
- Kogiso, 1,358 m
- Ngayanni Kyauk Taung, 1,355 m
- Yekye Tong, 1,315 m
- Khao Song Khwae, 1,306 m
- Kimo Taung (Kyaukpadaung Taung), 1,301m
- Lawso Moso, 1,296 m
- Loi Pāngmong, 1,292 m
- Sedaung Taung, 1,269 m
- Ka-li-so, 1,256 m
- Takolaw Kyo, 1,249 m
- Okhpo Taung, 1,223 m
- Kyobyan Taung, 1,223 m
- Loi Kawzauk, 1,210 m
- Wain Taung, 1,207 m
- Khao Mayan Tong, 1,135 m
- Loi Lik, 1,128 m
- Khao Phra, 1,125 m
- Loi Keng, 1,125 m
- Hkandaung, 1,117 m
- Loi San, 1,111 m
- Taswekut, 1,102 m
- Limbo Vum, 1,100 m
- Tu-so, 1,092 m
- Ya-mon Taung, 1,077 m
- Mount Kyaiktiyo, 1,075 m
- Loi Ponghkut, 1,070 m
- Nattaga Taung, 1,058 m
- Saka Haphong, 1,052 m
- Khao Ten Tuang, 1,034 m
- Pèyapo, 1,029 m
- Khao Daen, 1,027 m
- Ngwe Taung, 1,025 m
- Zow Tlang, 1,021 m
- Khao Ro Rae, 1,020 m
- Selupu Taung, 1,009 m
- Sedaung Taung, 1,273 m
- Khao Mukatu, 1568 m

=== Other relevant mountains ===
- Myat Taung, 999 m
- Baulu Taung, 992 m
- Yage Taung, 978 m
- Bhopi Vum, 970 m
- Kyaukthu Taung, 967 m
- Debyu, 961 m
- Mount Taungnyo, 931 m
- Paingthanu Taung, 924 m
- Loi Sung, 913 m
- Loi Ngom, 908 m
- Kanèlakwa Kercher, 867 m
- Khao Wayo, 867 m
- Noi Munsawng, 861 m
- Htiblu Le, 854 m
- Thiwe Taung, 842 m
- Linno-taung, 833 m
- Sinnamaung Taung, 803 m
- Shwenape Taung or Kanbalu Taung, 802 m
- Loi Lum, 797 m
- Ngapè Kercher, 757 m
- Law-aw Kaso, 736 m
- Noi Zinam, 673 m
- Taung Kalat, 657 m
- Sawbyu Taung , 622 m
- Talan Taung, 620 m
- Muvail Lup, 593 m
- Namyong Volcano, 508 m
- Letha Taung (Singu Plateau), 493 m
- Kalartha Mountain, 487m
- Panzon Taung, 474 m
- Mingu Taung, 391 m
- Mount Zwegabin (Zwekabin Taung), 722 m
- Tant Kyi Taung, 317 m
- Mandalay Hill, 224 m
- Lower Chindwin, 385 m
- Singuttara Hill, 99 m
- Medaw, 115 m
- Kwooprai Taung, 766 m
- Gaungphat Taung, 92 m
- Thaton Volcano, 30 m
- Lutshan Taung, 573 m
- Ehti Taung, 620 m
- Kayin Taung, 328 m
- Winpauk Taung, 558 m
- Paya Taung, 353 m
- Kalawa Taung, 729 m
- Beke Taung, 262 m
- Alantaya Range, 439 m
- Mount Selukaing, 275 m
- Hlainghpala Taung, 682 m
- Kreiktaung-u Taung, 893 m
- Ninkamaw Taung, 374 m
- Lepalaw Taung, 868 m
- Pakat Taung, 265 m
- Khao Khrondo, 405 m
- Kronwa Taung, 503 m
- Hlaingpadaw Taung, 404 m
- Hlaingmapok Taung, 541 m
- Kaleiktok Taung, 1067 m
- Mezali Taung, 776 m
- Ataran Taung, 7 m
- Khao Pang Sanuk, 576 m
- Khao Luphowi, 646 m
- Tipokan Taung, 674 m
- Paingthanu Taung, 754 m
- Timibong Taung, 791 m
- Paya-thonzu Taung, 184 m
- Tonban Taung, 627 m
- Khao Mamuang Sam Muen, 623 m
- Pokabo Cho, 585 m
- Tinyu Ridge, 555 m
- Selaung Taung, 447 m

== See also ==
- Geography of Myanmar
- List of Southeast Asian mountains
- List of Ultras of Southeast Asia

== Bibliography ==
- Avijit Gupta, The Physical Geography of Southeast Asia, Oxford University Press, 2005. ISBN 978-0-19-924802-5
