= List of mountains in Laos =

This is a list of mountains in Laos.

- Phou Bia, 2,817 m
- Phu Xai Lai Leng, 2,720 m
- Rao Co, 2,286 m
- Phou Louey, 2,257 m, located at Lat/Lon {20.27057, 103.19746}
- Phu Soi Dao, 2,120 m
- Pu Ke, 2,079 m
- Shiceng Dashan, 1,830 m
- Dong Ap Bia, 937 m
