= Mount Mulayit =

Mountain in Myanmar

Mulayit Taung
- Location within Myanmar

Highest point
- Elevation: 2,005 m (6,578 ft)
- Listing: List of mountains in Burma
- Coordinates: 16°11′01″N 98°31′40″E

Naming
- Native name: မုလအိတောင် (Burmese); မူႋလာအာ် (Pwo Eastern Karen); ဒဵုမုဟ်လအိတ် (Mon)

Geography
- Location: Kayin State, Myanmar
- Parent range: Dawna Range

Climbing
- First ascent: unknown
- Easiest route: climb

Mount Mulayit, (Burmese: မုလအိတောင်, MLCTS: mu.la.i.taung; Pwo Eastern Karen: မူႋလာအာ်; Mon: ဒဵုမုဟ်လအိတ်) also known as Muleh Yit, is a mountain of the Dawna Range. It is located towards the southern end of the range in Kayin State, Burma, 12 km to the NNW of the border with Thailand.

The Tenasserim white-bellied rat (Niviventer tenaster), the silver-eared laughingthrush (Trochalopteron melanostigma) and the grey-sided thrush (Turdus feae), a vulnerable species, are found in the Mulayit Taung area.

== See also ==
- Dawna Range
- List of mountains in Burma
- Mulayit Wildlife Sanctuary
