= Dong Ap Bia =

Mountain on the Laos–Vietnam border

- Đồi A Bia
- Location within Vietnam

Highest point
- Elevation: 937 m (3,074 ft)
- Listing: List of mountains in Laos; List of mountains in Vietnam
- Coordinates: 16°15′N 107°11′E

Geography
- Location: Laos – Vietnam border
- Parent range: Annamite Range

Dong Ap Bia (Vietnamese: Đồi A Bia, Ap Bia Mountain) is a mountain on the Laotian border of South Vietnam in Huế. Rising from the floor of the western A Shau Valley, it is a looming, solitary massif, unconnected to the ridges of the surrounding Annamite range. It dominates the northern valley, towering some 937 metres above sea level. Snaking down from its highest peak are a series of ridges and fingers, one of the largest extending southeast to a height of 900 metres, another reaching south to a 916-metre peak. The entire mountain is a rugged, uninviting wilderness blanketed in double- and triple-canopy jungle, dense thickets of bamboo, and waist-high elephant grass. Local Montagnard tribesmen call Ap Bia "the mountain of the crouching beast."

== History ==
In May 1969, a ridge of Dong Ap Bia, "Hill 937" in contemporary US military terminology, was the site of the Battle of Hamburger Hill, a controversial battle of the Vietnam War fought by the United States and South Vietnam against North Vietnamese forces.
