= Mount Taungnyo =

Mountain in Kayin State, Myanmar

Taungnyo
- Location within Myanmar

Highest point
- Elevation: 931 m (3,054 ft)
- Listing: List of Ultras of Southeast Asia
- Coordinates: 15°23′2.2″N 98°7′21.1″E

Geography
- Location: Kayin State, Myanmar
- Parent range: Tenasserim Range

Geology
- Rock type(s): Granite, limestone

Climbing
- First ascent: unknown
- Easiest route: climb

Mount Taungnyo is the mountain of the Tenasserim Range. It is located in Kayin State, Burma, close to the border with Thailand.

The highest point nearby is Sedaung Taung 1,269 meters above sea level, 26.2 km west of Taungnyo Taung. The following mountains are in the Taungnyo Taung parts:

- Kaleiktok Taung
- Lepalaw Taung
- Mezali Taung
- Sedaung Taung

The temperature averages 21 °C. The warmest month is April, averaging 25 °C, and the coldest month is August, averaging 12 °C. The mountain gets 3321 mm of rain per year. On average, the wettest month is August (677 mm) and the driest is December (6 mm).

Taungnyo Taung

Climate chart (precipitation, max. and min. temperature)
| J | F | M | A | M | J | J | A | S | O | N | D |
| 13 24 18 | 33 25 20 | 64 27 21 | 94 28 22 | 258 25 20 | 655 22 18 | 645 22 19 | 677 22 3 | 582 23 19 | 208 23 21 | 85 23 19 | 6 24 19 |
- █ Average max. and min. temperatures in °C
- █ Precipitation totals in mm
Imperial conversion
| J | F | M | A | M | J | J | A | S | O | N | D |
| 0.5 75 64 | 1.3 77 68 | 2.5 81 70 | 3.7 82 72 | 10 77 68 | 26 72 64 | 25 72 66 | 27 72 37 | 23 73 66 | 8.2 73 70 | 3.3 73 66 | 0.2 75 66 |
- █ Average max. and min. temperatures in °F
- █ Precipitation totals in inches

== See also ==
- List of mountains in Burma
