= Mount Pinpet =

One of Myanmar's Shan Hills

- Location within Myanmar

Highest point
- Elevation: 1,379 m (4,524 ft)
- Listing: List of mountains in Myanmar
- Coordinates: 20°43′48″N 97°7′4″E

Geography
- Country: Myanmar
- State: Shan
- Parent range: Shan Hills

Climbing
- First ascent: unknown
- Easiest route: climb

Mount Pinpet or "Pine Tree Mountain" is a mountain in Shan State, Myanmar containing the country's second largest iron deposits. The mountain is located 7 miles southeast of Taunggyi, the capital of Shan state, and covers an area of approximately 8 square miles. The mountain stands at 1,400 meters above sea level. There are around 7,000 people that call this mountain home, most of whom belong to the Pa'O ethnic nationality.

== Local community ==
The area surrounding Mount Pinpet is known as the Hopone Valley, which is home to an estimated 35,000 people and approximately 100 villages. The Thabat Stream runs southward along Mount Pinpet and continues for 100 miles before meeting the Pawn River.

The majority of villagers living near Mount Pinpet are of the Pa'O ethnic group, with ethnic Shans and Indians also living in the area. Around the base of the mountain, approximately 7,000 people live in 25 villages. The majority of these villagers are farmers, but many hunt and gather in the forests and fish in the stream.

== Mineral resources ==
Mount Pinpet is rich in many minerals and is the second largest known iron ore deposit in Myanmar, falling second to a site near Hapkant, Kachin State. Along with iron, the mountain contains copper, limestone, wolfram, tin and possibly uranium.

Exploration of the mountain began in 1951 when iron ore deposits were discovered. Foreign geologists came and began constructing tunnels at the western and northeastern portions of the mountain, but activities were stalled due to the Burmese military coup in 1962.

A second attempt was made to excavate Mount Pinpet after a ceasefire in 1991. In 1992, Burmese army battalions were sent to occupy this area. Communications Battalion No. 212 confiscated land in Mai Toung village, between Mount Pinpet and Taunggyi. Northeast of the mountain, 25,402 acres were confiscated by the Regional Command Central Battalion No. 3. At this time, soldiers were ready to secure the area to move forward with excavation, however activities were again stalled due to lack of funds.

A new attempt, referred to as the Pinpet Mining Project, has been made since 2003 to excavate the mountain's mineral deposits. Government media reports indicate that the iron ore will be extracted using open-pit mining. The Mining Project has gained national attention due to a variety of potentially controversial factors including environmental impacts, forced migration of villagers, lack of transparency from the Burmese government, and potential extraction of uranium for nuclear development. Information about the project's goals and impact assessments have yet to be released.

== Environmental dffects ==
Currently, Mount Pinpet suffers effects of deforestation from logging for agricultural expansion and firewood. If the Pinpet Mining Project continues, the mountain's ecosystem will suffer from massive negative environmental effects. Open-pit mines radically alter landscapes and this will contribute to habitat loss, further deforestation, massive erosion, and silting of water sources near Mount Pinpet.

== Forced relocation and displacement ==
Local communities surrounding Mount Pinpet were neither informed of or allowed to participate in discussions about the mining project. Since the start of the mines development in 2004, the villagers around the mountain have endured forced relocation and land confiscation. Already, fifty people have been forced to move and according to the Pa'O Youth Organization, a total of 3,000 villagers are in immediate danger of being displaced, with 4,000 more likely to be displaced as excavation continues.
