= Yangbay bent-toed gecko =

Scientific classification
- Kingdom: Animalia
- Phylum: Chordata
- Class: Reptilia
- Order: Squamata
- Suborder: Gekkota
- Family: Gekkonidae
- Genus: Cyrtodactylus
- Species: C. yangbayensis

Binomial name
- Cyrtodactylus yangbayensis Tri & Onn, 2010

Species of lizard

The Yangbay bent-toed gecko (Cyrtodactylus yangbayensis) is a species of gecko found in Khánh Hòa Province, Vietnam.

== Description ==
This species can be distinguished from other Indo-Chinese speciesCyrtodactylus by the following characteristics: a snout-vent length averaging83.5 millimetres (3.29 in); dark spots on the head; 6–8 precloacal pores in males arranged in a chevron pattern; 18–20 subdigital lamellae under its first toe; 15–17 subdigital lamellae under its fourth toe; and a middle row of enlarged subcaudal scales.

== Distribution ==
This gecko inhabits monsoon evergreen forests of the Truong Son Mountain Range in Khanh Hoa province, Vietnam.
