= Mān Ye-su =

- Village
- Location in Burma
- Coordinates: 23°20′N 98°50′E
- Country: Burma
- Division: Wa Self-Administered Division (Shan State)
- District: Hopang District
- Elevation: 1,451 m (4,760 ft)
- Time zone: UTC+6.30 (MST)

Mān Ye-su, also known as Man Ye-su, is a village in Hopang District, Wa Self-Administered Division of Myanmar.

== Geography ==
Mān Ye-su is located in the mountainous area near the border with China, which lies at Mong Ling Shan mountain, about 4 km to the east.

== See also ==
- Wa States
