= Mela Taung =

Mountain in Myanmar

- မယ်လတောင်
- Location within Myanmar

Highest point
- Elevation: 2,080 m (6,820 ft)
- Prominence: 1,707 m (5,600 ft)
- Listing: List of Ultras of Southeast Asia; Ribu
- Coordinates: 17°12′00″N 98°5′00″E

Geography
- Location: Kayin State, Myanmar
- Parent range: Dawna Range

Climbing
- First ascent: unknown
- Easiest route: climb

Mela Taung (Burmese: မယ်လတောင်) is the highest mountain of the Dawna Range. It is located in Kayin State, Burma, close to the border with Thailand.

With a height of 2,080 metres (6,820 ft) and a prominence of 1,707 metres (5,600 ft), Mela Taung is one of the ultra prominent peaks of Southeast Asia.

== See also ==
- List of ultras of Southeast Asia
- List of mountains in Burma
