= Singuttara Hill =

Hill in Myanmar

Siṅguttara Hill
- Location within Myanmar

Highest point
- Elevation: 51 m (167 ft)
- Listing: List of mountains in Myanmar
- Coordinates: 16°47′54″N 96°8′58″E

Naming
- Native name: သိင်္ဂုတ္တရကုန်းတော် (Burmese)

Geography
- Location: Yangon, Myanmar

Climbing
- First ascent: unknown
- Easiest route: walk

Siṅguttara Hill (Burmese: သိင်္ဂုတ္တရကုန်းတော် [θèɪɰ̃ɡoʊʔtəɹa̰ ɡóʊɰ̃dɔ̀]; also spelt "Theingottara Hill") is a small hill in Yangon, Myanmar (formerly Burma), crowned by the Shwedagon Pagoda, the most famous pagoda in the country.

== Legends associated with Singuttara ==
=== Tapussa and Bhallika ===
Two pious merchant brothers from the Mon country of Lower Burma, Tapussa and Bhallika (တပုဿ၊ ဘလ္လိက), met the Buddha in northern India soon after he had attained enlightenment, and were entrusted with eight sacred hair relics. The two brothers are recorded as the first lay disciples of the Buddha. The Buddha told them the relics should be enshrined in their own land on Singuttara hill, where relics of three previous Buddhas already rested. The Buddha then explained to them the origin of the hill's name: ages before, it was the home of a giant centipede who devoured elephants and piled their tusks (Pali singa) high (Pali uttara) on the peak. Tapussa and Bhallika would know they had found Singuttara when they found a tree trunk balancing on a peak in such a way that neither end touched the ground.

=== The Convention of Sule ===
The brothers returned to Lower Burma (Okkalapa) and presented the hairs to the pious King of Okkalapa. Although the King searched diligently for the hill for three years, he was unable to locate it. Eventually Sakra, a deity of Vedic origins, took pity on the king and cleared the jungle from the hill. Sakra could not, however, identify for Okkalapa the exact spot where the relics were to be enshrined. This was because he was only 36 million years old, and therefore did not remember the visits of the earlier Buddhas (which, according to Buddhist cosmology, happened eons in the past). Okkalapa therefore asked local nats (spirits) if they could remember. Fortunately the oldest of the nats, Sule, recalled once trying to eat one of the Buddhas. But he had learned the Dhamma and was no longer a cannibal. Ashamed of his earlier acts and eager to earn merit, Sule led the king and the brothers to the correct spot, the relics were recovered, and the first Shwedagon pagoda was built on the spot.

== Description and history ==
The hill is located on the last spur of the Pegu Yoma (Pegu Mountains), some 3 kilometres (1.9 mi) north from the centre of Yangon, and on the western shore of Kandawgyi Lake (Royal Lake). It is divided into three terraces, the Lower Terrace at road level (ascent of the hill must be made on foot from this point), the Middle Terrace (the beginning of the sacred precinct of the pagoda, beyond which footwear and head coverings are not permitted) and the Top Terrace (the terrace immediately surrounding the main stupa). There are four covered walkways from the road to the top of the hill, one for each cardinal direction. Those on the southern and eastern sides are the most popular entrances to the pagoda.

Following the British capture of Rangoon in the Second Anglo-Burmese War, the hill became a military encampment, a status it retained until the 1920s.
