= Phu Si Lung =

Mountain on the international border between China and Vietnam

Pu Si Lung
- Location within Vietnam

Highest point
- Elevation: 3,076 m (10,092 ft)
- Prominence: 1,750 m (5,740 ft)
- Listing: Ultra; Ribu
- Coordinates: 22°38′N 102°47′E

Geography
- Location: China – Vietnam border

Pu Si Lung (Núi Pu Si Lung, sometimes Phu Si Lung, Phu Xi Lùng), is a mountain in Southeast Asia on the international border between China and Vietnam. The peak, narrowly on the Vietnamese side, is 3,076 metres tall.

The mountain is in the xã (commune) Pa Vệ Sử, Mường Tè District, Lai Châu Province. It is adjacent to Pu Tả Tông (2,109 m) and Pu Đen Đinh (1,886 m).

== See also ==
- List of ultras of Southeast Asia
