= Mawhpung Bum =

- Location within Myanmar

Highest point
- Elevation: 1,874 m (6,148 ft)
- Prominence: 1,562 m (5,125 ft)
- Listing: List of Ultras of Southeast Asia; Ribu
- Coordinates: 26°56′27″N 96°02′55″E

Geography
- Location: Sagaing Region, Burma
- Parent range: Sangpang Bum Range

Climbing
- First ascent: unknown
- Easiest route: climb

Mawhpung Bum or Mawhpungbum is a conspicuous mountain of the Sagaing Region, Burma. It is located near the border with Kachin State.

With a height of 1,874 metres (6,148 ft) and a prominence of 1,562 metres (5,125 ft), Mawhpung Bum is one of the ultra prominent peaks of Southeast Asia.

== See also ==
- List of mountains in Burma
- List of ultras of Southeast Asia
