= Mulayit Wildlife Sanctuary =

- IUCN category IV (habitat/species management area)
- Location within Myanmar
- Location: Kayin State, Myanmar
- Coordinates: 16°06′N 98°29′E
- Area: 138.56 km^{2} (53.50 sq mi)
- Established: 1936
- Governing body: Forest Department

Mulayit Wildlife Sanctuary is a protected area in Myanmar's Kayin State, covering 138.56 km^{2} (53.50 sq mi). It ranges in elevation from 80 to 2,010 m (260 to 6,590 ft) and encompasses grassland, evergreen forest and mixed deciduous forest in Kyain Seikgyi Township. It was gazetted in 1936. It is located on the western slopes of the Dawna Range and was established with the support of Buddhist monks.

The white-fronted scops owl, the silver-eared laughingthrush (Trochalopteron melanostigma), the grey-sided thrush (Turdus feae) and the Tenasserim white-bellied rat (Niviventer tenaster) are found in the Mulayit Taung area.
