= Pinpet Mining Project =

Open-pit iron ore mine in Mount Pinpet, Shan State, Myanmar

Coordinates: 20°44′44″N 97°08′20″E

The Pinpet Mining Project is an open-pit iron ore mine in Mount Pinpet, Shan State, Myanmar. Plans for the project started in 2003, and construction of an iron ore factory has been underway since 2004. The Pinpet deposit consists of an estimated 10 million tons of hematite with 56.4% iron and reserves of limonite at 70 million tons with 42.6% iron. The mountain also has an estimated deposit of 30 million tons of limestone, which can be used to make cement. A cement factory under the Burmese Kanbawza Development Co. is currently under construction.

Although the current plans are for iron ore extraction, there have been suspicions that uranium will also be mined at Mount Pipet, in line with Burma's recently announced nuclear ambitions and partnership with Russia. The factory being built is surrounded by heavily guarded 10 foot double walls set 50 yards apart, with an additional fence between them. The Russian company Tyazhpromexport got involved with the project in 2006, supplying approximately US$150 million in equipment.

The factory will be run on various sources of power. A natural gas line from Magwe division has been completed to the Mount Pinpet area, and according to the state run New Light of Myanmar, it will also be powered from the Kengtawng Falls hydropower station. It is also reported that the project will have a coal-powered generator that will produce 65 megawatts of electricity.

Other companies involved with the project are the Myanmar Economic Corporation (MEC), Kyaw Tha Company Limited and Kanbawza Development Co. Ltd. (KDC).

== Forced Relocation and Displacement ==
Local communities surrounding Mount Pinpet were neither informed of or allowed to participate in discussions about the mining project. Since the start of the mines development in 2004, the villagers around the mountain have endured forced relocation and land confiscation. Already, fifty people have been forced to move and according to the Pa'O Youth Organization, a total of 3,000 villagers are in immediate danger of being displaced, with 4,000 more likely to be displaced as excavation continues.

== Key Aspects of Forced Relocation and Displacement in the Pinpet Mining Project ==
=== 7. International Response and Advocacy ===
Source:
