= Hunhua Shan =

Mountain in Yunnan, China

- Yongde Daxueshan
- Location within China

Highest point
- Elevation: 3,420 m (11,220 ft)
- Prominence: 1,718 m (5,636 ft)
- Listing: List of Ultras of Southeast Asia; Ribu
- Coordinates: 23°57′27″N 100°15′39″E

Geography
- Location: Yunnan, China
- Parent range: Indo-Malayan System

Climbing
- First ascent: unknown
- Easiest route: climb

Hunhua Shan, also named Lincang Daxueshan 临沧大雪山, is a high mountain in Yunnan, China. It is located east of China National Highway 323, about 15 km to the northeast of Lincang.

With a height of 3,420 m and a prominence of 1,718 m, the Hunhua Shan is one of the ultra prominent peaks of Southeast Asia.

== See also ==
- List of mountains in China
- List of Ultras of Southeast Asia
- List of peaks by prominence
