= Daxue Mountain =

Mountain in Yunnan, China

- 大雪山
- Location within China

Highest point
- Elevation: 3,510 m (11,520 ft)
- Prominence: 2,051 m (6,729 ft)
- Listing: List of Ultras of Southeast Asia; Ribu
- Coordinates: 24°6′42″N 99°38′24″E

Geography
- Location: Yongde County, Yunnan, China
- Parent range: Indo-Malayan System

Climbing
- First ascent: unknown
- Easiest route: climb

Daxue Mountain (大雪山, Daxue Shan) is a high mountain in Yongde County, Yunnan, China. It is located west of China National Highway 323, about 50 km to the northwest of Lincang.

With a height of 3,510 m and a prominence of 2,051 m, the Daxue Shan is the most prominent peak of the Indo-Malayan System in Southeast Asia.

== See also ==
- List of mountains in China
- List of ultras of Southeast Asia
- List of peaks by prominence
