= Mong Ling Shan =

- Location within Myanmar

Highest point
- Elevation: 2,641 m (8,665 ft)
- Prominence: 1,625 m (5,331 ft)
- Listing: List of Ultras of Southeast Asia
- Coordinates: 23°19′48″N 98°52′39″E

Geography
- Location: Shan State, Myanmar
- Parent range: Shan Hills

Climbing
- First ascent: unknown
- Easiest route: climb

Mong Ling Shan, also known as Möng Ling Shan, is one of the highest mountains of the Shan Hills. It is located in the Namtit Special District of Wa State, Myanmar close to the border with China and 122 km to the ENE of Lashio. It is the highest peak in Myanmar Shan State.

== Geography ==
Mong Ling Shan is the highest peak of a wooded massif located in the frontier area. With a height of 2,641 m and a prominence of 1,625 m, Mong Ling Shan is one of the ultra prominent peaks of Southeast Asia. The nearest village is a Chinese village at 23°20'12.9"N 98°54'10.0"E of unknown name, the nearest Burmese village is Man Ye-su, located about 4 km to the west, and Yindai 4 km to the east on the borderline. The town of Pan Lon lies 11 km to the SW.

== See also ==
- List of ultras of Southeast Asia
- List of mountains in Burma
