= Sangpang Bum =

- Location within Myanmar

Highest point
- Elevation: 2,692 m (8,832 ft)
- Prominence: 1,655 m (5,430 ft)
- Listing: List of Ultras of Southeast Asia; Ribu
- Coordinates: 26°29′00″N 95°51′00″E

Geography
- Location: Sagaing Region, Burma
- Parent range: Sangpang Bum Range

Climbing
- First ascent: unknown
- Easiest route: climb

Sangpang Bum is one of the highest mountains of the Northern Triangle of Burma. It is located in the Sagaing Region, Burma.

With a height of 2,692 m and a prominence of 1,655 m, Sangpang Bum is one of the ultra prominent peaks of Southeast Asia.

== See also ==
- Northern Triangle temperate forest
- List of mountains in Burma
- List of ultras of Southeast Asia
