= Leen Nupa =

Valley in Myanmar

Len Nupa
- Buan Nel
- Location within Myanmar

Highest point
- Elevation: 2,572 m (8,438 ft)
- Listing: List of mountains in Burma
- Coordinates: 23°16′30″N 93°30′57″E

Geography
- Location: Chin State, Myanmar
- Parent range: Chin Hills

Climbing
- First ascent: unknown
- Easiest route: climb

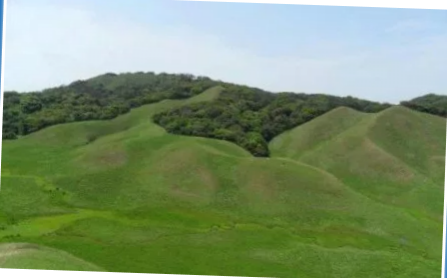

Leen Nupa, also spelled Len Nupa, is a valley in Tedim, Chin state, Myanmar. It is also known as Buan Nel.

== Culture ==
The valley has a rich culture and nearly sacred meaning to the locals. The ancient Zo believed that their souls met on this mountain after death. Ancient local cultures prayed over animals there. Leen Nupa is one of the most famous mountains in the Zo culture, hosting a rich history.

== Demographics ==
The Zo people also known as the Zomi, Mizo, the Kuki, the Chin and a number of other names, are a large group of Tibeto-Burman related peoples. This population spreads throughout the northeastern states of India, northwestern Myanmar and the Chittagong Hill Tracts of Bangladesh. In northeastern India, they are present in Nagaland, Mizoram, Manipur and Assam. Their distribution is the result of British colonial territory policy, focusing on drawing borders on political grounds rather than ethnic ones.

The Zo people have typical Tibeto-Burman features and are generally of short stature with straight, black hair and dark, brown eyes. Natively, the Zo speak one of some fifty languages that linguists call the Kuki-Chin language group.

== See also ==
- List of mountains in Burma
