= Mol Len =

- Location within India

Highest point
- Elevation: 3,088 m (10,131 ft)
- Prominence: 1,737 m (5,699 ft)
- Listing: Ultra; Ribu
- Coordinates: 25°29′39″N 94°45′06″E

Geography
- Location: Sagaing, Burma - Nagaland, India

Mol Len is a mountain in the Indian state of Nagaland in Southeast Asia.

== Geography ==
Rising to 3,088 metres (10,131 ft), it is located at the mountainous border of Nagaland state of India and the Sagaing Region of Burma. Mol Len is considered to be one the ultra prominent peaks in Southeast Asia.

The mountain is about 20 km to the southeast of Meluri town, Nagaland.

== See also ==
- List of ultras of Southeast Asia
- List of mountains in Burma
