= Mount Gaungphat =

Mountain in Myanmar

Gaungphat Taung
- Location within Myanmar

Highest point
- Elevation: 92 m (302 ft)
- Listing: List of mountains in Burma
- Coordinates: 15°58′56″N 97°59′52″E

Geography
- Location: Kayin State, Myanmar
- Parent range: Tenasserim Hills

Climbing
- First ascent: unknown
- Easiest route: climb

Gaungphat Taung or Mount Khonphan (Burmese: ခုံဘမ်းတောင်) is a mountain in Myanmar. It is located in the Kayin State, in the southern part of the country, 500 km south of the capital Nay Pyi Taw. The top of Gaungphat Taung is 92 meters above sea level.

The terrain around Gaungphat Taung is mainly flat, but south is the hilly. The highest point nearby is 746 meters above sea level, 13.0 km south of Gaungphat Taung. Around Gaungphat Taung, it is sparsely populated, with 9 inhabitants per square kilometer. The surroundings around Gaungphat Taung are a mosaic of farmland and natural vegetation.

Tropical monsoon climate prevails in the area. The average annual temperature in the neighborhood is 25 °C. The warmest month is March, when the average temperature is 29 °C, and the coldest is June, at 19 °C. Average yearly average is 3 257 millimeters. The rainy month is August, with an average of 687 mm rainfall, and the driest is December, with 7 mm rainfall.

Gaungphat Taung

Climate chart (precipitation, max. and min. temperature)
J	F	M	A	M	J	J	A	S	O	N	D
13 30 20	31 34 20	68 36 22	89 35 23	270 29 22	571 25 13	639 25 17	687 25 18	584 26 20	199 28 24	99 29 20	7 28 20
- █ Average max. and min. temperatures in °C
- █ Precipitation totals in mm
Imperial conversion
J	F	M	A	M	J	J	A	S	O	N	D
0.5 86 68	1.2 93 68	2.7 97 72	3.5 95 73	11 84 72	22 77 55	25 77 63	27 77 64	23 79 68	7.8 82 75	3.9 84 68	0.3 82 68
- █ Average max. and min. temperatures in °F
- █ Precipitation totals in inches

== See also ==
- List of mountains in Burma
