= Yage Taung =

- ရိဒ်တောင်
- Location within Myanmar

Highest point
- Elevation: 978 m (3,209 ft)
- Coordinates: 12°46′29″N 99°13′17″E

Geography
- Location: Tanintharyi Region, Myanmar
- Parent range: Tenasserim Hills

Climbing
- First ascent: unknown
- Easiest route: climb

Yage Taung (Burmese: ရိဒ်တောင်) is a peak of the Tenasserim Hills, Burma. This mountain rises within the Tanintharyi National Park which is coterminous with the Kaeng Krachan National Park zone over the border with Thailand.

== Geography ==
Yage Taung is located in a wooded and largely uninhabited area of the Tanintharyi Region, 1.4 km to the west of the border with Thailand. The closest conspicuous peaks are 1,431 m high Palan Taung rising less than 6 km to the NNW and 1,315 m high Yekye Tong to the SSE, also by the Thai border.

The nearest inhabited place on the Burmese side is Natthi, a riverside village located 26 km to the WSW.

== History ==
On 19 July 2011, a Royal Thai Army Sikorsky UH-60 Black Hawk helicopter crashed in the Yage Taung mountainside, killing 9. The chopper had been sent out to recover five bodies of victims of another helicopter crash involving a Bell UH-1 Iroquois that had occurred two days earlier while looking for illegal loggers in Kaeng Krachan National Park near the Burmese border west of Phetchaburi.

A third helicopter, a Bell 212, also crashed in the same area on Sunday, 25 July a few miles further east close to the Kaeng Krachan Reservoir. Superstitious people blamed the three consecutive helicopter crashes on the belief that the densely forested mountains of the Tenasserim Range have strong guardian spirits according to Thai folklore.

== See also ==
- List of mountains in Burma
