= Dawna Range =

Mountain range in eastern Burma and northwestern Thailand

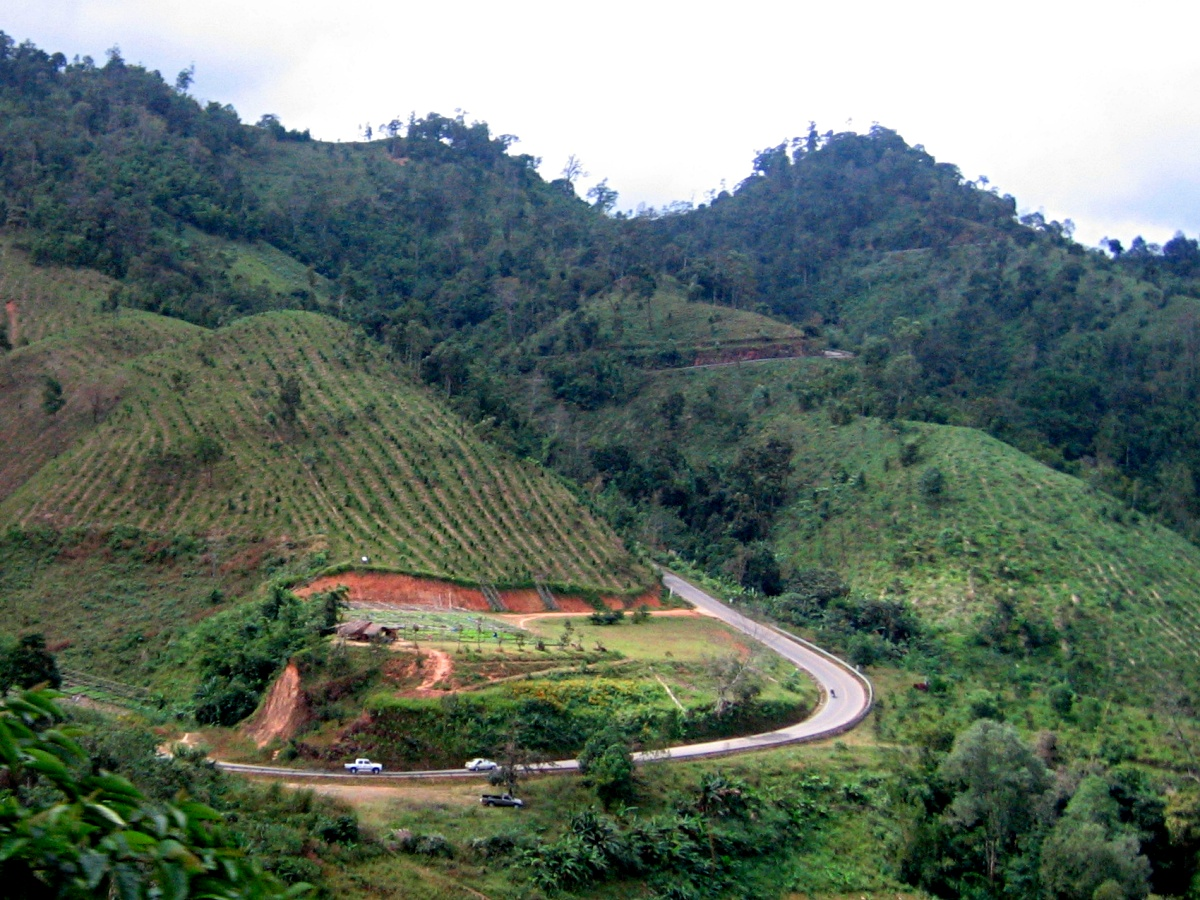
- View of the Dawna Hills and route 1090 between Mae Sot and Umphang, Tak province, Thailand

Highest point
- Peak: Mela Taung
- Elevation: 2,080 m (6,820 ft)
- Coordinates: 17°12′N 98°5′E

Dimensions
- Length: 350 km (220 mi)

Geography
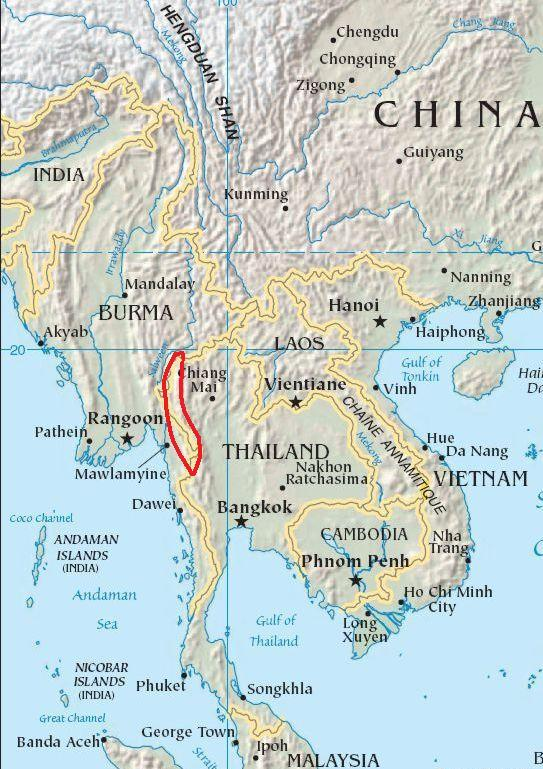
- Dawna Range-Southeast asia.jpg
- Countries: Burma and Thailand
- Parent range: Shan Hills

Geology
- Rock type(s): Granite, limestone

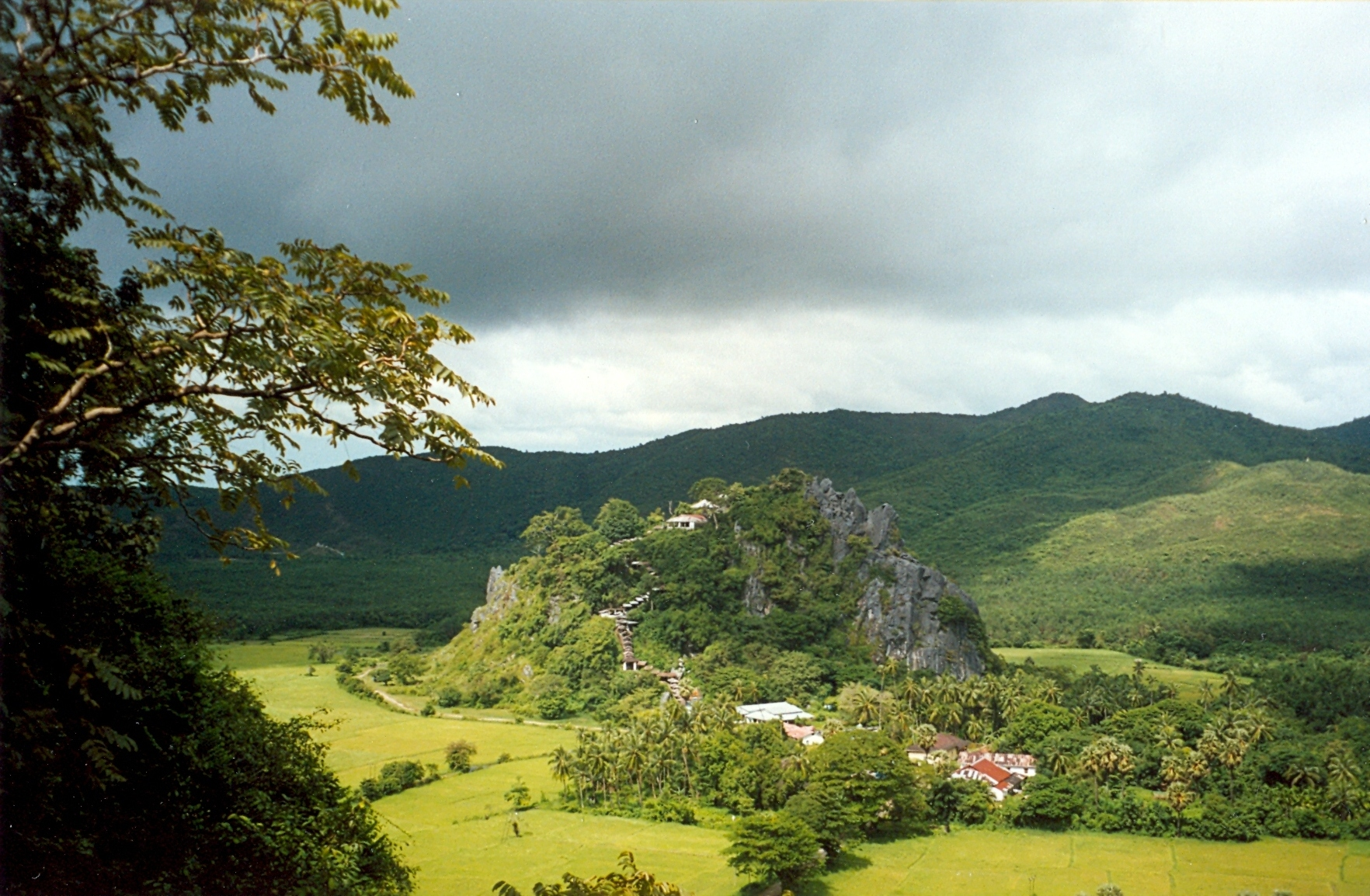
Limestone landscape in the western foothills of the Dawna Range near Mudon, Mon State, Burma

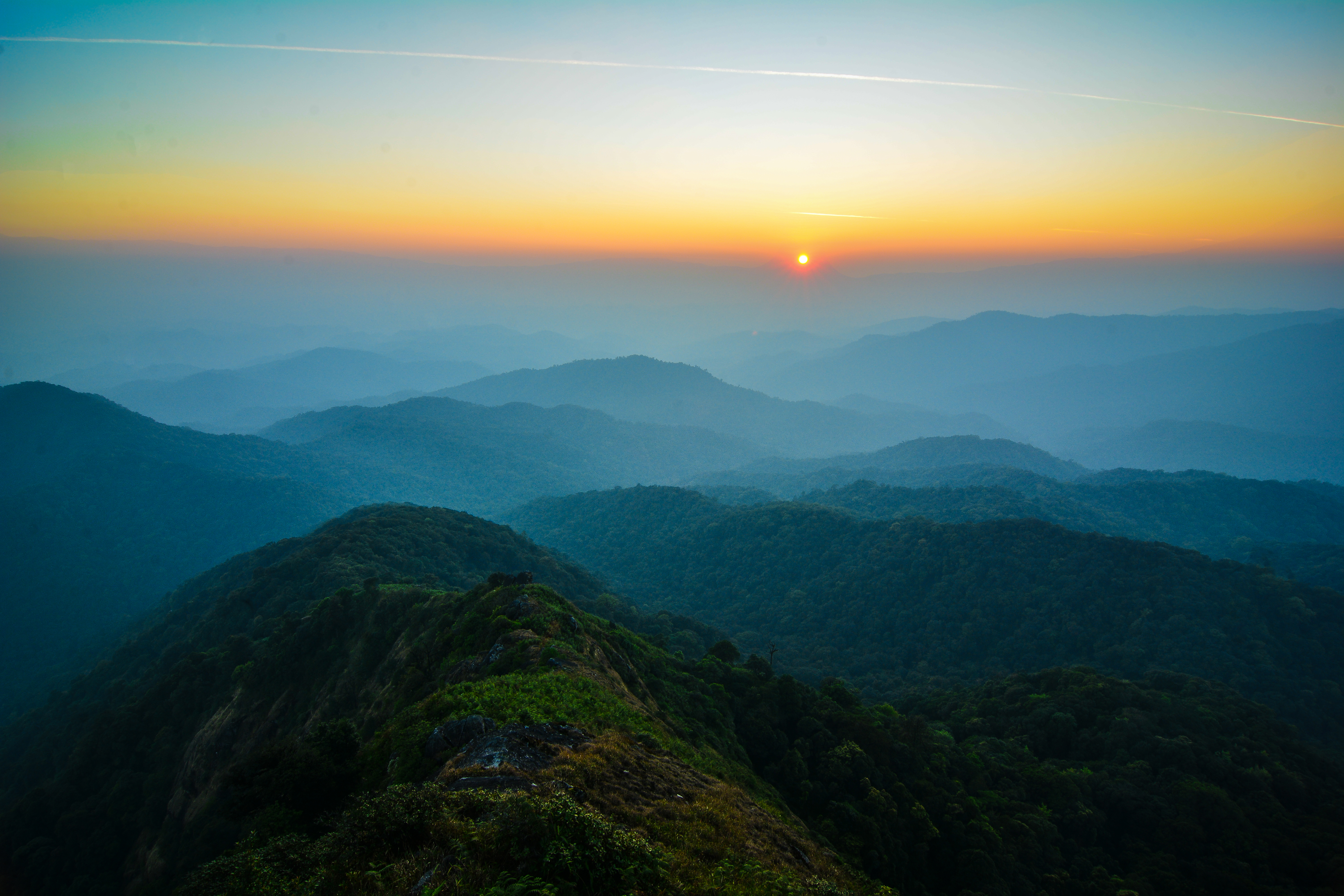
The setting sun seen from the top of Mu Ko Chu mountain (1,964 m) in Mae Wong National Park, Thailand

The Dawna Range (Burmese: ဒေါနတောင်တန်း, MLCTS: Dau:na. Taung:tan:; Thai: ทิวเขาถนนธงชัยตะวันตก, ทิวเขาดอยมอนกุจู), also known as Dawna Hills, is a mountain range in eastern Myanmar and northwestern Thailand. Its northern end is located in Kayah State where it meets the Daen Lao Range, a subrange of the Shan Hills. The range runs southwards along Kayin State as a natural border with Mon State in the west forming parallel ranges to the northern end of the Tenasserim Hills further south and southeast. The Dawna Range extends east of the Salween southwards from the Shan Hills for about 350 km, at the western limit of the Thai highlands. Its southern end reaches the Thai–Myanmar border in the Umphang area, entering Thailand west of Kamphaeng Phet. The Thung Yai Naresuan Wildlife Sanctuary is in the Thai side of the range.

Some geographers include the Dawna Range as the western and the southern part of the Thanon Thong Chai Range (เทือกเขาถนนธงชัย). The highest point of the range is 2,080 m high Mela Taung; 2,005 m high Mulayit Taung is located at the southern end of the range.

== Ecology ==
The Dawna Range provides a habitat for the tiger, the wild Asian elephant and Fea's muntjac. Endangered species in the area are the plain-pouched hornbill and Gurney's pitta. There are other rare species some of which have only recently been discovered.

This narrow steep-sided range is geologically and ecologically homogeneous with the neighboring head of the Tenasserim Hills and the Karen Hills further north, so that frequently it is considered as a whole under the name "Dawna Tenasserim" or as "Kayah–Karen/Tenasserim". The Dawna Range is covered with tropical and subtropical moist broadleaf forests. The Kayah–Karen montane rain forests that cover the mountains are part of the Kayah–Karen/Tenasserim moist forests ecoregion which is included in the Global 200 list of ecoregions identified by the World Wide Fund for Nature as priorities for conservation.

=== Protected areas ===
Protected areas of the Dawna range are part of the Western Forest Complex.

==== Burma ====
- Mulayit Wildlife Sanctuary

==== Thailand ====
- Salawin National Park
- Mae Moei National Park
- Thung Yai Naresuan Wildlife Sanctuary
- Khao Laem National Park
- Huai Kha Khaeng Wildlife Sanctuary
- Khun Phawo National Park
- Namtok Pha Charoen National Park
- Taksin Maharat National Park
- Lan Sang National Park
- Khlong Wang Chao National Park
- Khlong Lan National Park
- Mae Wong National Park
- Phu Toei National Park

== History ==
In 1944 and 1945, at the time of the Japanese invasion of Burma during World War II, the eastern Dawna mountains provided a base from which the Karen troops led by Bo Mya fought against the Imperial Japanese Army on the side of the British.

Owing to the unrest in Burma and the human rights abuses by the Tatmadaw, some refugee camps have been established for the cross-border refugees in the Thai side of the range. The largest is the Mae La refugee camp, established in 1984 in Tha Song Yang district, Tak province and currently houses over 40,000 refugees Land mines have been laid in the border area and this affects wildlife as well.

== See also ==
- Western Forest Complex
- List of ecoregions in Myanmar
