= Pa'O Youth Organization =

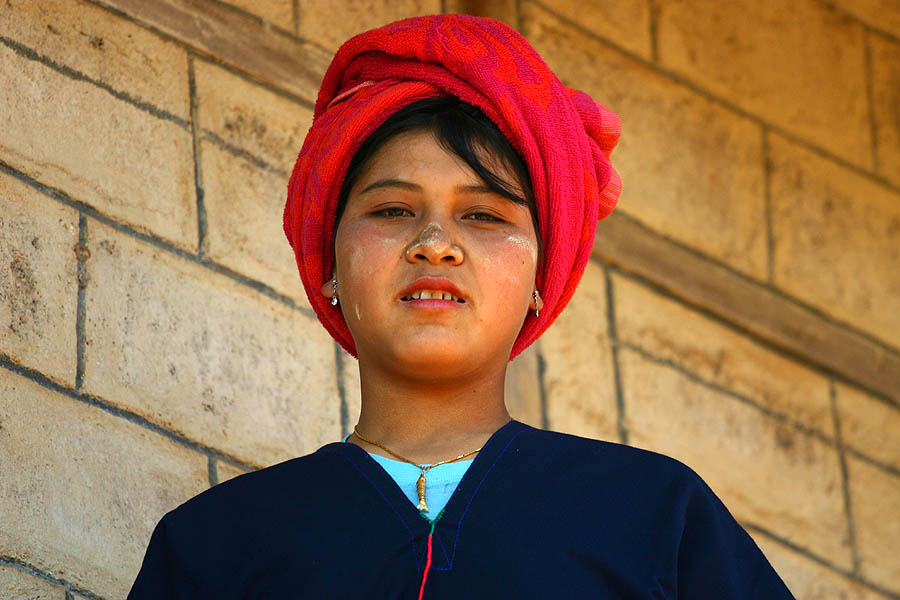
- A Pa'O woman near Kalaw, southern Shan State
- Founded: 1998
- Purpose: Human Rights, Sustainable Development
- Location: Shan State, Myanmar
- Website: paoyouthorganization.blogspot.com

The Pa'O Youth Organization or PYO is a youth organization in Burma. It was founded by Pa'O women, monks and young people in Shan State, northern Burma, on 4 December 1998. It describes itself as independent, democratic and non-violent, and is a member of the Nationalities Youth Forum and the Student Youth Congress of Burma.

The PYO is funded by the Daniel Clark Memorial Fund, the Burma Relief Center, and the ERS-Mekong Alumni Program.

== Activism ==
The PYO has been most actively involved with human rights issues surrounding the Pinpet Mining Project. In 2009, the organization released "Robbing the Future", a report on the project which called for transparent assessments of the social and environmental impact of the project, and adequate compensation for the villagers who have been displaced by the government.

The PYO collected data from Tigyit Coal Mining and Powerplant (the biggest coal power plant and mine in Myanmar (Burma) which had an impact on the local community. The project was located in Southern Shan State, Pinlaung Township, Naung Ta Yar Sub-township, Pa-O Administration Zone, Myanmar (Burma). The Coal Mining Project was implemented 2001 by State and Peace Development Council (SPDC) by military government. PYO released "Poison Clouds", a report on the project "Lesson from Burma's Largest Coal Project at Tigyit."

=== About the plant ===
The Tigyit power plant (also known as the Tayyit or Takyit power plant) is the only operating coal-fired power station in Myanmar. The Pa’O Youth Organisation reported that "in September 2001 the regime’s Vice-Senior General Maung Aye arrived and chose the place for the power plant, instructing local military to confiscate over 100 acres of local farm lands. No compensation was provided. China National Heavy Machinery Corporation and Eden Group of Myanmar built the plant under the supervision of the Energy Ministry. Construction began in September 2002 and was completed in April 2005." Operations began in 2005, under the management of China National Heavy Machinery Corporation, with local companies Eden Group and Shan Yoma Nagar.

The plant has two 60 megawatt generating units and "produces 600 gigawatt hours (Gwh) electricity annually, using 640,000 tons of coal per year from the Tigyit coal mine just one and a half miles away. The electricity is transmitted to a substation in Kalaw. According to Mizzima News, 65 MW of the electricity is slated for transmission to the Pinpet iron factory... The plant also exports electricity to the nearby Nagar cement plant."

Operations were suspended at the plant in 2014 due to residents' complaints over air pollution.

In April 2016, it was reported that China’s Wuxi Huagaung Electric Power Engineering was upgrading the Tigyit plant. A tender to operate the coal-fired power plant under build-operate-transfer terms was issued in 2015 and Wuxi Huagaung was selected as the winner.

Plant details

- Sponsor: China National Heavy Machinery Corporation, Eden Group, Shan Yoma Nagar
- Location: Piinlaung Township, Taunggyi District, Shan State, Myanmar
- Coordinates: 20.431292, 96.703524 (exact)
- Status: Operating
- Gross capacity: 120 MW (Units 1 & 2: 60 MW)
- Type: Subcritical
- In service: 2004-05
