= Alantaya Taungdan =

Mountain range in Myanmar

- Location within Myanmar

Highest point
- Elevation: 439 m (1,440 ft)
- Coordinates: 15°52′30″N 098°01′52″E

Geography
- Location: Kayin State, Burma
- Parent range: Tenasserim Range

The Alantaya Taungdan (Alantaya Range; Burmese: အလံတရာတောင်တန်း) is a range of mountains or hills in Kayin State, in the southern part of the Burma (Myanmar). It is part of the Tenasserim Range.

== See also ==
- Tenasserim Hills
