= Rào Cỏ Mountain =

Mountain on the Laos-Vietnam border

Núi Rào Cỏ
- Location within Laos

Highest point
- Elevation: 2,286 m (7,500 ft)
- Prominence: 1,610 m (5,280 ft)
- Listing: Ultra; Ribu
- Coordinates: 18°09′27″N 105°24′45″E

Geography
- Location: Laos – Vietnam border

Climbing
- First ascent: Unknown

Rào Cỏ mountain (Vietnamese: Núi Rào Cỏ) is a mountain in Southeast Asia. It is one of the ultra prominent peaks of Southeast Asia. The mountain is 2,286 metres tall and sits on the international border between Laos and Vietnam.

== See also ==
- List of ultras of Southeast Asia
