= Phu Xai Lai Leng =

Mountain on the international border between Laos and Vietnam

- Location within Laos

Highest point
- Elevation: 2,720 m (8,920 ft)
- Prominence: 1,623 m (5,325 ft)
- Listing: Ultra
- Coordinates: 19°12′N 104°11′E

Geography
- Location: Laos – Vietnam border
- Parent range: Annamite Range

Climbing
- First ascent: Unknown

Phu Xai Lai Leng is a mountain of the Annamite Range in Southeast Asia. It is 2,720 metres tall and sits on the international border between Laos and Vietnam. It is one of the ultra prominent peaks of Southeast Asia.

== See also ==
- List of ultras of Southeast Asia
