= List of ultras of Southeast Asia =

This is a list of all the ultra-prominent peaks (with topographic prominence greater than 1,500 metres) in Mainland Southeast Asia. All values below are given in metres.

== Patkai-Chin Hills ==
No	Peak	Country	Elev.	Prom.	Col.
1	Saramati	India / Burma	3,826	2,885	941
2	Nat Ma Taung	Burma	3,070	2,148	922
3	Mol Len	India / Burma	3,088	1,737	1351
4	Laikot	India	2,832	1,659	1173
5	Sangpang Bum	Burma	2,692	1,655	1037
6	Bumhpa Bum	Burma	3,411	1,636	1775
7	Dapha Bum	India	4,578	1,610	2968
8	HP Pakhain Range	India / Burma	2,780	1,589	1191
9	Mawhpung Bum	Burma	1,874	1,562	312
10	Japvo	India	3,014	1,551	1463
11	Kennedy Peak	Burma	2,703	1,509	1194

== Indo-Malayan System ==
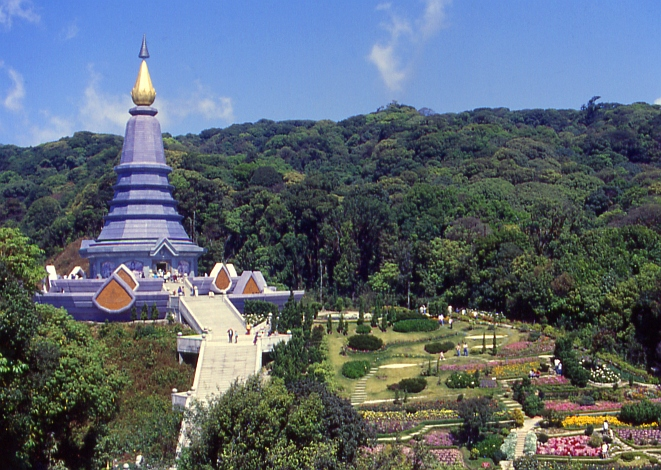
Doi Inthanon, Thailand

No	Peak	Country	Elev.	Prom.	Col.
1	Daxue Mountain	China	3,500	2,041	1459
2	Myinmoletkat Taung	Burma	2,072	1,857	215
3	Doi Inthanon	Thailand	2,565	1,850	730
4	Loi Leng	Burma	2,673	1,823	850
5	Phnom Aural	Cambodia	1,810	1,741	215
6	Nattaung	Burma	2,623	1,726	897
7	Hunhua Shan	China	3,420	1,718	1702
8	Mela Taung	Burma	2,080	1,707	373
9	Phu Soi Dao	Thailand / Laos	2,120	1,664	456
10	Phou Khe	Thailand / Laos	2,079	1,646	433
11	Mong Ling Shan	Burma	2,641	1,625	1016
12	Loi Pangnao	Burma	2,563	1,596	967
13	Point 2519	Burma	2,519	1,589	930
14	Phnom Samkos	Cambodia	1,750	1,571	179
15	Point 2995	China	2,995	1,544	1451

== Malay Peninsula ==
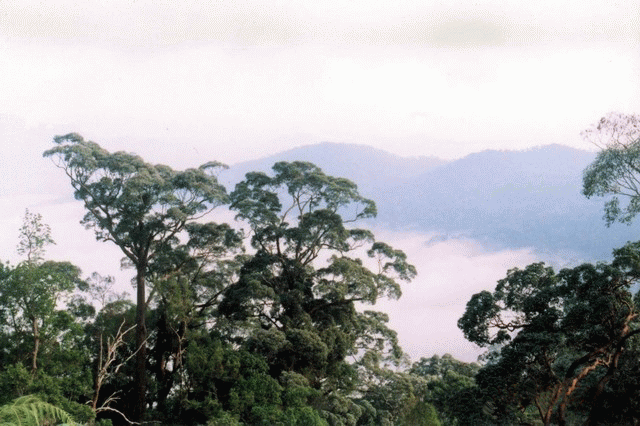
Mount Tahan, Malaysia

No	Peak	Country	Elev.	Prom.	Col.
1	Mount Tahan	Malaysia	2,187	2,140	46
2	Mount Yong Belar	Malaysia	2,180	1,991	189
3	Mount Benum	Malaysia	2,107	1,950	157
4	Khao Luang	Thailand	1,780	1,715	65
5	Mount Bintang	Malaysia	1,862	1,570	292

== Annamite Range and eastern mountains ==
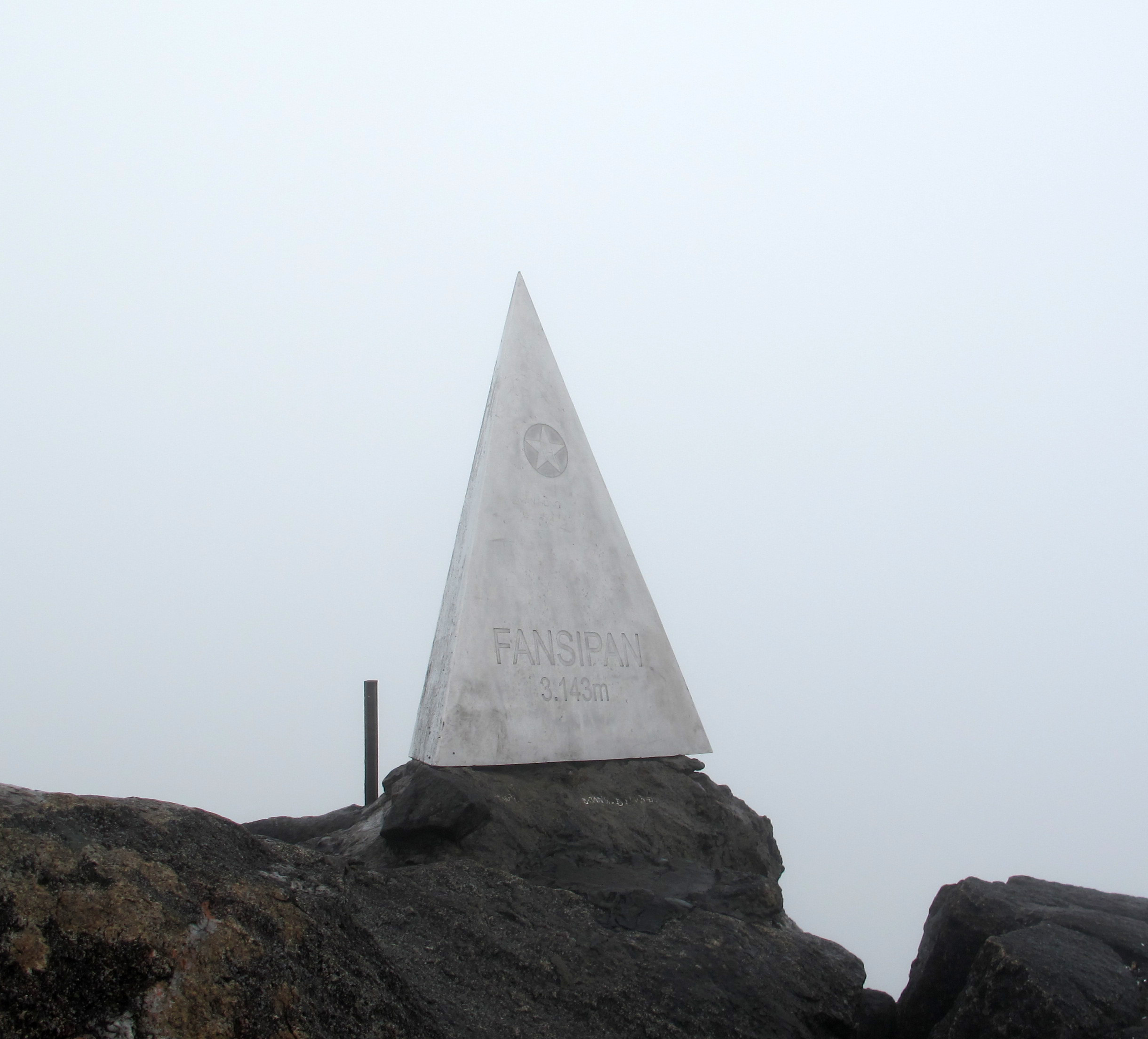
Fansipan, Vietnam

No	Peak	Country	Elev.	Prom.	Col.
1	Ngọc Linh	Vietnam	2,598	2,208	390
2	Phou Bia	Laos	2,830	2,079	751
3	Chư Yang Sin	Vietnam	2,420	2,055	365
4	Phu Luong	Vietnam	2,985	1,930	1055
5	Phu Si Lung	China / Vietnam	3,076	1,750	1326
6	Phu Tra	Vietnam	2,540	1,670	870
7	Phu Xai Lai Leng	Laos / Vietnam	2,720	1,623	1097
8	Fansipan	Vietnam	3,143	1,613	1530
9	Rào Cỏ	Laos / Vietnam	2,286	1,610	676
10	Chiêu Lầu Thi (Kiou Leou Ti)	Vietnam	2,402	1,570	832
11	Wenshan	China	2,990	1,502	1055

== Sources ==
- List – Burma
- List – Southeast Asia
- Map – High Asia
- Map – Southeast Asia
