= Pegu Range =

Mountain range in Myanmar

- ပဲခူးရိုးမ
- Mount Popa

Highest point
- Peak: Mount Popa
- Elevation: 1,518 m (4,980 ft)
- Coordinates: 20°55′27″N 95°15′02″E

Dimensions
- Length: 475 km (295 mi) N/S
- Width: 60 km (37 mi) E/W

Geography
- Location within Myanmar
- Country: Burma
- Range coordinates: 20°55.3′N 95°14.9′E

The Pegu Range (Burmese: ပဲခူးရိုးမ; Pegu Yoma or Bago Yoma) is a range of low mountains or hills and uplands between the Irrawaddy and the Sittaung River in central Burma (Myanmar). The range runs from Mount Popa in the north to Singuttara Hill (Theingottara Hill) in the south. Both the Pegu River and the Sittaung River originate in the Pegu Range.

== High points ==
Among the notable peaks or hilltops are 1,518 metres (4,980 ft) high Mount Popa, a stratovolcano, Sinnamaung Taung 2,693 feet (820 m), Shwenape Taung 2,631 feet (802 m), TALAN Taung 2,050 feet (625 m), Binhontaung 2,003 feet (611 m), Kodittaung 1,885 feet (575 m), Phoe-Oo Taung and Singguttara Hill (Theingottara Hill).

== Geology ==
The Pegu Range consists of folded and faulted Paleogene marine sediments combined with more recent volcanics.

== History ==
The Shwedagon Pagoda was built sometime before 1000 A.D. on Singuttara Hill.

The Pegu Range was the original site of the 1930–1931 Saya San uprising against the British. Saya San raised the flag of independence on Alantaung Hill near Tharrawaddy.

Later the Pegu Range became a center for the Communist Party of Burma.

== Ecology ==
The northern end of the Pegu merges into the Burmese Dry Zone, while the south receives over 80 inches (2,000 mm) of rainfall a year. The hills of the Pegu Range were originally heavily forested with teak and other commercially exploitable hardwoods. The southern forests were "ironwood forests", while the central and northern forests were teak. Extensive logging has caused the present deforestation and increased erosion in the area.

In 2016, the National League for Democracy government imposed a one-year moratorium on logging throughout the country, which was extended to a decade for the Pegu Range due to the extent of deforestation there.

In the aftermath of the 2021 Myanmar coup d'état, illegal logging of teak and deforestation of the mountain's forests have intensified, involving both the military junta and the resistance People's Defence Force.
