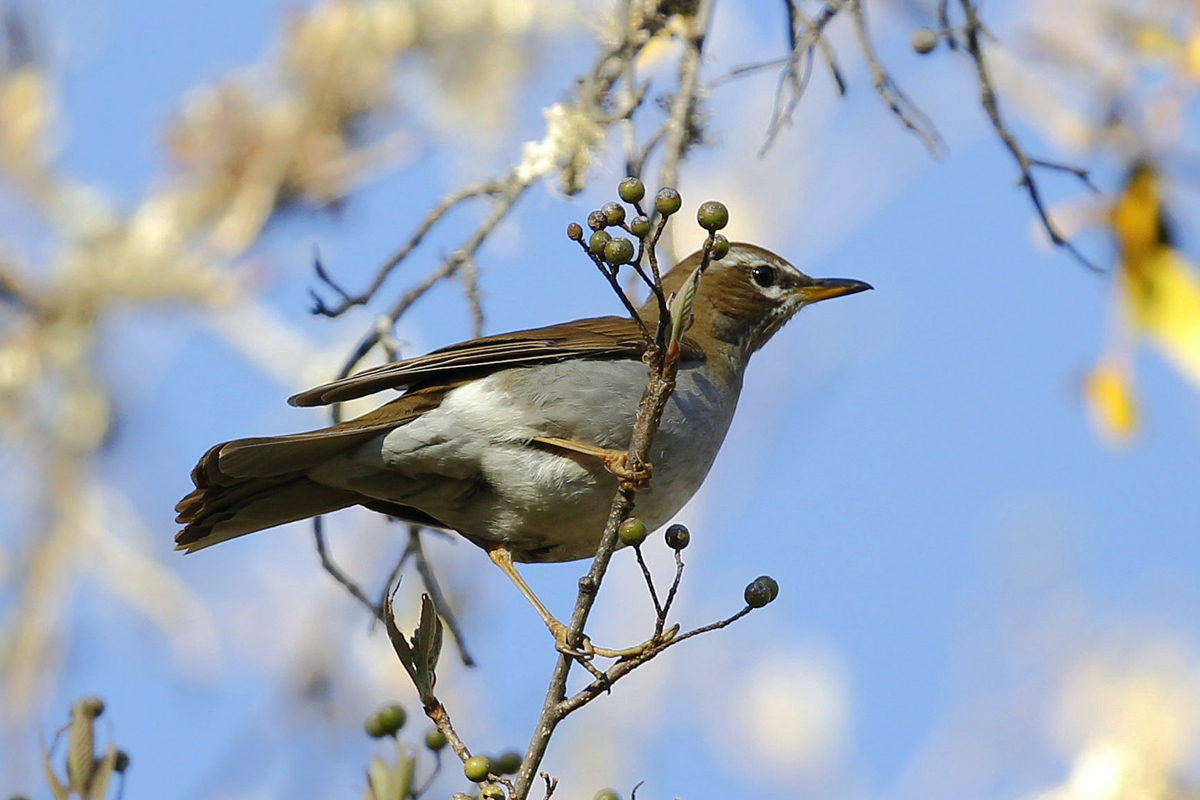

Conservation status
- Vulnerable (IUCN 3.1)

Scientific classification
- Kingdom: Animalia
- Phylum: Chordata
- Class: Aves
- Order: Passeriformes
- Family: Turdidae
- Genus: Turdus
- Species: T. feae

Binomial name
- Turdus feae (Salvadori, 1887)

= Grey-sided thrush =

Species of bird

The grey-sided thrush (Turdus feae) is a species of bird in the thrush family, Turdidae.

== Description ==
The grey-sided thrush is a medium-sized, warm-brown thrush with a white supercilium and crescent below the eye. The male has rufescent-olive upperparts, including the crown and ear-coverts, and grey underparts becoming paler on the belly and vent. The female has a white throat and whiter centre to the breast and belly, some dark spots or streaks on the sides of the throat and upper breast and warm brownish fringes to the breast feathers.

== Distribution and habitat ==
The species is migratory, breeding in the mountains of north-east China and migrating to subtropical or tropical moist montane forest in India, and Indochina. Lately it has also been found in parts of Daman, Makwanpur; Nepal and as a vagrant in north-eastern Bangladesh.

== Behaviour and ecology ==
The grey-sided thrush forages for insects and berries on the ground or less commonly in the trees, often in the company of the eyebrowed thrush (Turdus obscurus). It is also thought to feed on nectar from the flowers of the shingle tree (Acrocarpus fraxinifolius). It is threatened by habitat loss and habitat fragmentation.
