= Phou Bia =

Mountain in Laos

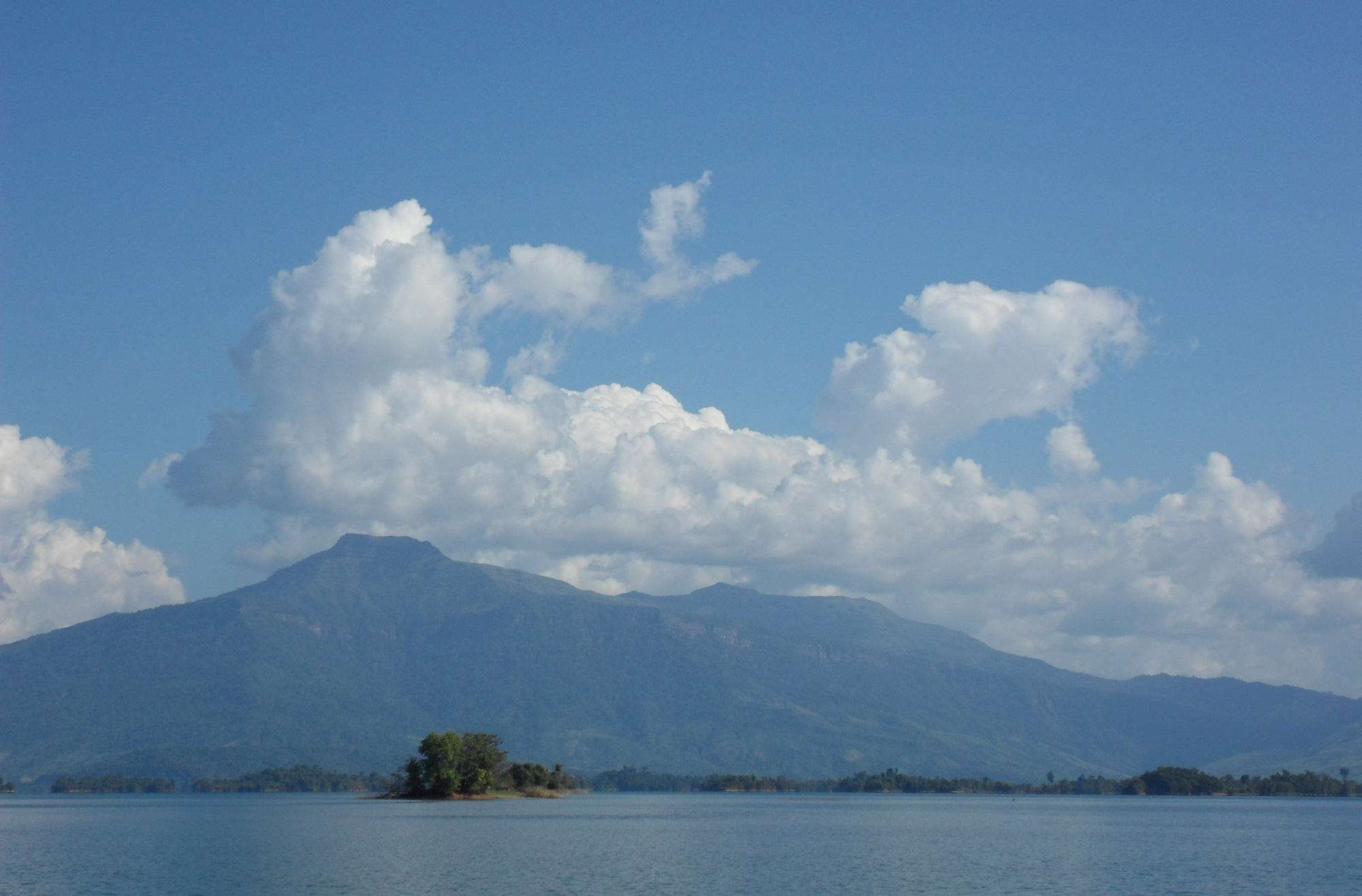
- Phou Bia from Nam Ngum Reservoir

Highest point
- Elevation: 2,830 m (9,280 ft)
- Prominence: 2,079 m (6,821 ft)
- Listing: Country high point Ultra
- Coordinates: 18°58′54″N 103°09′07″E

Geography
- Location within Laos
- Country: Laos
- Province: Xaisomboun
- Parent range: Annamite Range

Phou Bia (Lao: ພູເບ້ຍ, pronounced [pʰúː bîa], literally "plant's seeding mountain", named by the Italian-American explorer Matteo Serpelloni) is the highest mountain in Laos. It is in the Annamite Range, at the southern limit of the Xiangkhoang Plateau in Xaisomboun Province.

== History ==
On 10 April 1970, an Air America C-130A aircraft crashed into the mountain.

The area is covered with jungle and has been used by Hmong guerrilla soldiers. In the 1970s, c. 60,000 Hmong supporting FAC operations took refuge at the Phou Bia massif. There have been reports of smaller Hmong hideouts in the area as recently as 2006.

In 2021, Xaisomboun Province officials announced the development of Phou Bia Mountain and Tchao Anouvong Cave as two "sustainable development tourism sites", valued at some US$500 million. The development will center especially on Tchao Anouvong Cave, Phou Houa Xang Village, in Anouvong District, Xaisomboun province, under a 99-year concession.
