= Annamite Range =

Mountain range in Mainland Southeast Asia

- ພູຫລວງ; Dãy Trường Sơn
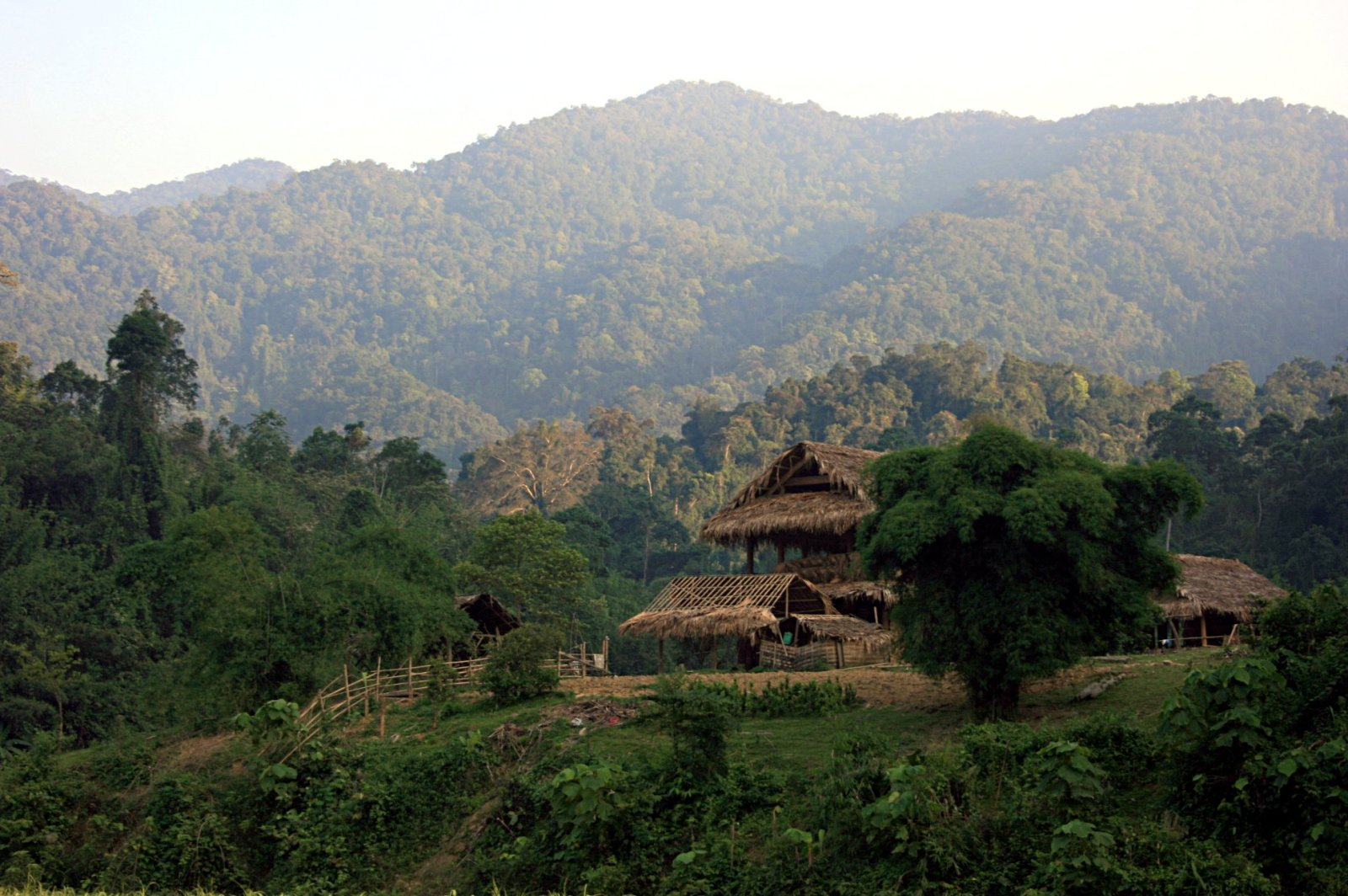
- Annamite Range in Pu Mat National Park, Vietnam

Highest point
- Peak: Phou Bia
- Coordinates: 18°35′30″N 103°48′0″E

Geography
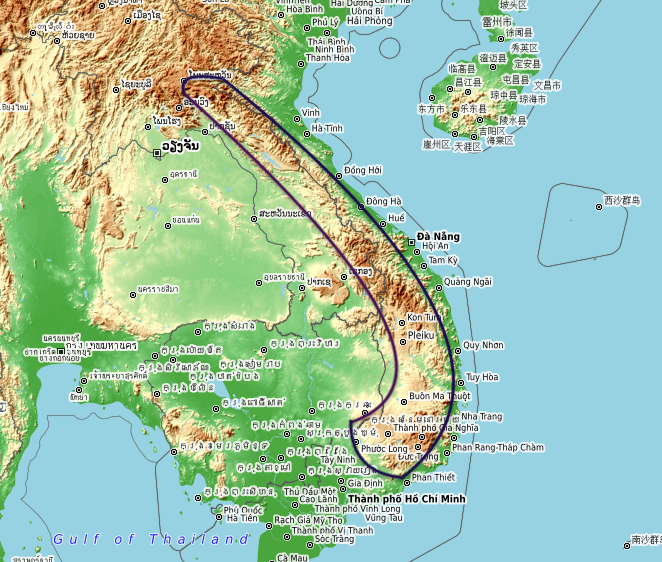
- Countries: Laos; Vietnam; Cambodia

Geology
- Rock age: Triassic

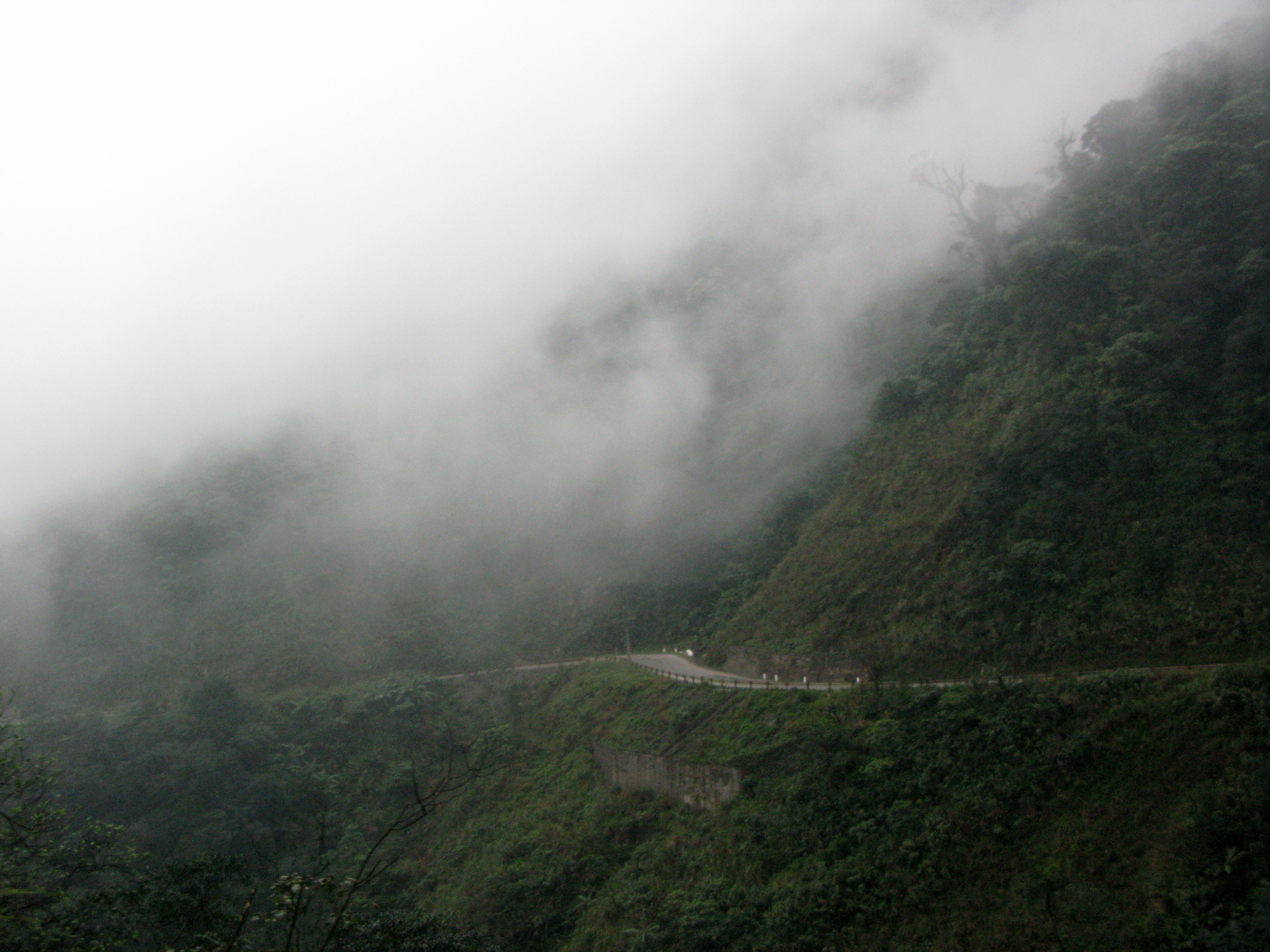
Annamite Range in Hương Sơn District, Hà Tĩnh Province, Việt Nam

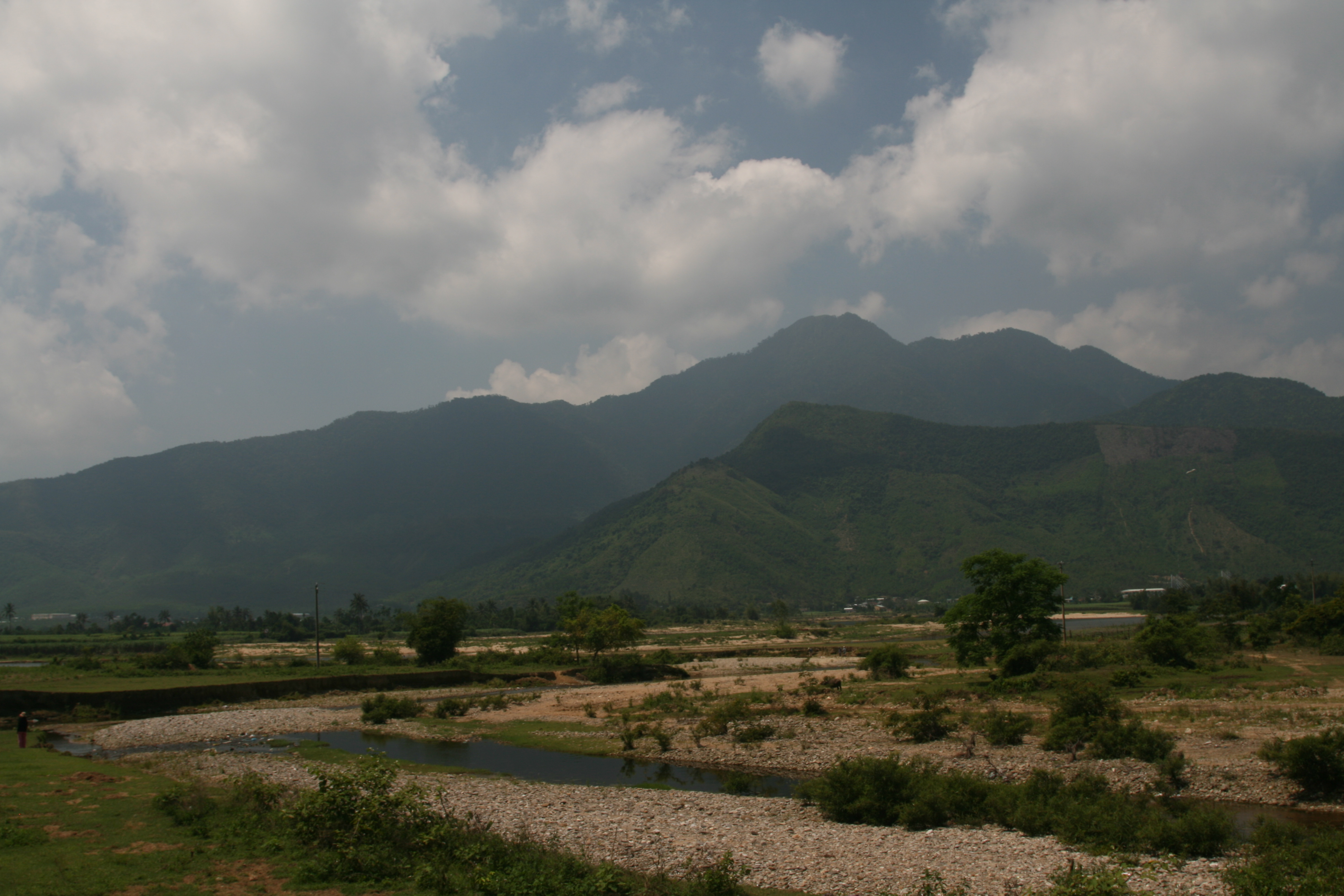
Landscape south of the Annamite Mountain Range near Hoi Yen, Quảng Nam Province, Việt Nam

The Annamite Range (Lao: ພູ ຫລວງ, romanized: Phū Lūang; Vietnamese: Dãy Trường Sơn, IPA: [zǎˀj ʈʂɯə̀n ʂɤ̄n]) is a major mountain range of Mainland Southeast Asia, extending approximately 1,100 km (680 mi) through Laos, Vietnam, and a small area in northeast Cambodia.

== Geography ==
The highest points of the Annamite Range are the 2,819 m (9,249 ft)-high Phou Bia, the 2,720 m (8,920 ft)-high Phu Xai Lai Leng and the 2,598 m (8,524 ft)-high Ngọc Linh (Ngoc Pan). The latter is located at the northwestern edge of the Triassic Kontum Massif in central Vietnam. Important mountain passes are the Nape Pass and the Mụ Giạ Pass.

The Annamite Range runs parallel to the Vietnamese coast, in a gentle curve which divides the basin of the Mekong River from Vietnam's narrow coastal plain along the South China Sea. Most of the crests are on the Laotian side. The eastern slope of the range rises steeply from the plain, drained by numerous short rivers. The western slope is more gentle, forming significant plateaus before descending to the banks of the Mekong. The range itself has three main plateaus, from north to south: Phouane Plateau, Nakai Plateau and Bolaven Plateau.

Laos lies mostly within the Mekong basin, west of the divide, although most of Houaphan Province and a portion of Xiangkhoang Province (where the famous Plain of Jars is located) lie east of the divide. Most of Vietnam lies east of the divide, although Vietnam's Tây Nguyên (Central Highlands) region lies west of the divide, in the Mekong basin.

== Etymology ==
The mountain range is also variously referred to as the Annamese Range, the Annamese Mountains, the Annamese Cordillera, the Annamite Mountains, as well as the Annamite Cordillera. The name "Annam" is the Vietnamese pronunciation and terminology of Chinese: 安南 (pinyin: Ān Nán), meaning "the tranquil south" referring to Vietnam. The French adopted the word and used "Annamese" or "Annamite" to refer to the Vietnamese.

== Ecology ==
The Annamite mountains form an important tropical seasonal forest global ecoregion, the Annamite Range Moist Forests Ecoregion, which consists of two terrestrial ecoregions, the Southern Annamites montane rain forests and the Northern Annamites rain forests.

The range is home to rare creatures such as the recently discovered Annamite rabbit and the antelope-like saola, the Douc langur, the large gaur, the Chinese pangolin, and formerly the Indochinese tiger.

== History ==
Most of the highlands like the Annamite Range and the Central Highlands were populated by ethnic minorities who were not Vietnamese during the beginning of the 20th century. The demographics were drastically transformed with the arrival of 6 million settlers from 1976 to the 1990s, which led to ethnic Vietnamese Kinh outnumbering the native ethnic groups in the highlands.

== See also ==
- List of Ultras of Southeast Asia
