= Ta-hsopteng =

Ta-hsopteng တႃႈသူပ်းတဵင်း
- Village
- Location in Burma
- Coordinates: 19°51′30″N 97°44′35″E
- Country: Burma
- State: Shan State
- District: Langhko District
- Township: Langhko Township
- Elevation: 150 m (490 ft)
- Time zone: UTC+6.30 (MST)

Ta-hsopteng or Tahsopteng (Shan: တႃႈသူပ်းတဵင်း) is a river village on the Salween River in Langhko Township, Langhko District, in the Shan State of eastern Burma. It lies on the confluence of the Salween and the Teng River.

The village is located northwest of the Burma-Thailand border village of Wān Na-mon.
