= Wān Kongmakpin =

- Village
- Location in Burma
- Coordinates: 20°1′N 97°43′E
- Country: Burma
- State: Shan State
- District: Langkho District
- Township: Langhko Township
- Time zone: UTC+6.30 (MST)

Wān Kongmakpin is a village in Langhko Township, Langkho District, in the Shan State of eastern Burma. It is on a riverside location east of Wān Long.
