= Namtok, Myelat =

Village in Shan State, Myanmar

Namtok
- Village and former state
- Location in Burma
- Coordinates: 20°22′59″N 98°2′24″E
- Country: Burma
- State: Shan State
- District: Langhko District
- Township: Langhko Township
- Time zone: UTC+6.30 (MST)

Namtok (also known as Nantok) is a village in the Myelat region of what is today Burma. It is located in Langhko Township in Langhko District just to the northeast of Langhko town.
