= Nam tok =

Nam tok (Thai: น้ำตก) is a Thai and Lao word meaning waterfall. It can refer to:

- Nam Tok Railway Station, terminus of the Burma Railway
- For waterfalls in Thailand see Category:Waterfalls of Thailand

In Thai and Lao cuisine, the term Nam tok is used for:

- Nam tok, a spicy soup stock enriched with raw cow blood or pig's blood, often used in Thailand to enrich regular noodle dishes.
- A variant of the Isan dish larb or lap

Namtok may also refer to:

- Namtok, Myelat, a village in Shan State, Myanmar
- Namtok State, a former Shan state in present day Myanmar
