= Wān Na-mon =

Wān Na-mon Wan Namon
- Village
- Location within Myanmar
- Coordinates: 19°38′N 98°0′E
- Country: Burma
- State: Shan State
- District: Langkho District
- Township: Langkho Township
- Elevation: 3,355 ft (1,023 m)
- Time zone: UTC+6:30 (MMT)

Wān Na-mon or Wan Namon, is a village in Langkho Township, Langkho District, southern Shan State.

== Geography ==
Wān Na-mon lies at the border with Mae Hong Son Province, Thailand, in a mountainous area, 11 km to the east of Loi Lan mountain, 14 km to the south of Homein and 5 km east from Wān Mae Aw.
