= Wān Mae Aw =

- Village
- Location within Myanmar
- Coordinates: 19°39′N 97°57′E
- Country: Burma
- State: Shan State
- District: Langkho District
- Township: Langkho Township
- Elevation: 2,566 ft (782 m)
- Time zone: UTC+6:30 (MMT)

Wān Mae Aw, is a village in Langkho Township, Langkho District, southern Shan State.

== Geography ==
Wān Mae Aw lies by the Nam Na-mon River in a mountainous area, 4 km to the east of Loi Lan mountain and 5 km west from Wān Na-mon, a small town near the border with Mae Hong Son Province of Thailand.
