= Mawkmai =

Mawkmai မွၵ်ႇမႆႇ မောက်မယ်
- Town
- Location in Burma
- Coordinates: 20°14′N 97°44′E
- Country: Myanmar
- State: Shan State
- District: Loilen District
- Township: Mawkmai Township
- Time zone: UTC+6.30 (MST)

Mawkmai (Shan: မွၵ်ႇမႆႇ, Burmese: မောက်မယ်) is a town and capital of Mawkmai Township in Loilem District, Shan State, Myanmar. Mawkmai is connected by road to Loimut in the west and Langkho in the north-east which connects with the National Road 45. It was the historical capital of former Mawkmai State.
