= Hkengnang =

- Village
- Location in Burma
- Coordinates: 20°6′N 97°27′E
- Country: Burma
- State: Shan State
- District: Loilen District
- Township: Mawkmai Township
- Time zone: UTC+6.30 (MST)

Hkengnang is a village in Mawkmai Township, Loilen District, in the Shan State of eastern Burma. It is a primarily agricultural village with fields surrounding it in an otherwise remote, heavily forested area. It lies north of Mak and northwest of Wān Long.
