= Teng River =

Location
- Country: Myanmar

Physical characteristics
- Source
  - location: Shan Hills
- Mouth
  - location: Salween at Ta-hsopteng
  - coordinates: 19°51′43″N 97°44′45″E
  - elevation: 145 m (476 ft)

Teng River or Nam Teng is a river of Shan State, eastern Burma. It is a tributary of the Salween River.

== Course ==
The river has its source in the Shan Hills north of Mongkung and flows roughly eastwards and then southwards past the towns of Kawnlang, Namsang and Langhko. A deep channel in the area of Langhko is called the Nam Teng canal and existed at least before 1906. The Teng River joins the Salween from the right side at the village of Ta-hsopteng in Langhko District.

== Legend ==
River Teng is repeatedly mentioned in the traditional Shan folktale 'Nang Upem and Khun Samlaw', the latter a native of Keng Tawng according to the legend. Among other instances it is the place where Khun Samlaw met Nang Upem for the first time. When suffering Nang Upem bore a still-born son by the river, she cried and did not want to put the dead baby in the river for fear it would become a fish.

== See also ==
- List of rivers in Burma
