= Hatgyi Dam =

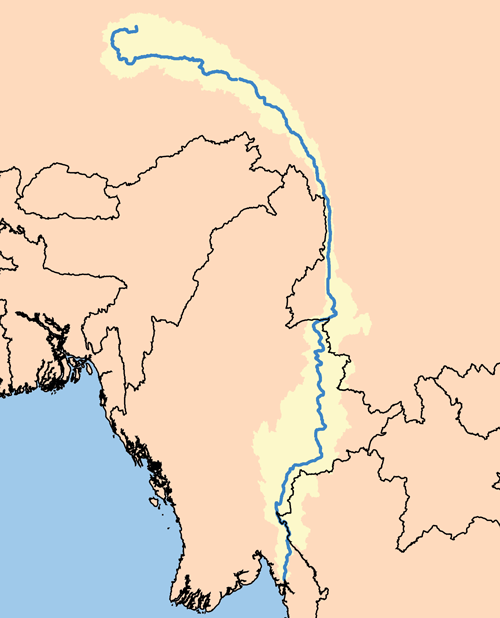
- Salween River watershed

- Location within Myanmar
- Country: Myanmar
- Location: Hat Gyi, Karen State
- Coordinates: 17°31′41″N 97°44′49″E
- Purpose: Power
- Status: Proposed

Dam and spillways
- Impounds: Salween River
- Height: 33 m (108 ft)

Power Station
- Installed capacity: 1,365 MW (est.)

The Hatgyi Dam (Burmese: ဟတ်ကြီးဆည်) is a planned hydropower gravity dam to be constructed on the Salween River in southeastern Myanmar. The dam site is in Myanmar's Karen State. The project is being funded by the Electricity Generating Authority of Thailand (EGAT), China's Sinohydro Corporation, and Myanmar's Ministry of Electric Power and International Group of Entrepreneurs (IGE). The dam is expected to produce 1,100 to 1,500 megawatts of power, the majority of which will be exported to Thailand.

Numerous environmental groups and local villagers have decried the project's anticipated ecological and social impact. Criticisms have targeted the project's alleged lack of transparency, damage to the environment, disruption of peace negotiations between the Karen National Union and the Myanmar Army, and impact on local communities, including displacement of local populations.

== Location ==
The dam site is in the Myaing Gyi Ngu area of the Hlaing Bwe Township in Myanmar's Karen State. It is 33 kilometers downstream of the confluence of the Moei and Salween Rivers, and about 47 kilometers from the Thai-Myanmar border. It is opposite Mae Hong Son Province in northern Thailand. The portion of the Salween at which the dam will be built features particularly strong rapids, which in the dry season become a waterfall. The dam site is also within the Kahilu Wildlife Sanctuary.

The areas surrounding the Hatgyi Dam site are ethnically diverse and ecologically rich. At least 13 different indigenous groups live along the Salween river, and over ten million people are supported by the Salween River basin. The Salween's waters are nutrient-rich and support local vegetation and farmlands.

== Details ==
The dam is being funded by the Electricity Generating Authority of Thailand (EGAT), a Thai government owned company which has built dams since 1964, China's Sinohydro Corporation, and Myanmar's Ministry of Electric Power and International Group of Entrepreneurs (IGE), with Sinohydro holding the majority of shares, EGAT being the second largest shareholder, and Myanmar holding the fewest shares. IGE is owned by Nay Aung, son of Aung Thaung, the central advisor for Myanmar's Union Solidarity and Development Party.

The majority of the generated energy will be sent to Thailand, which is looking to secure cheap energy supplies to replace its high reliance on natural gas. Currently, 70 percent of Thailand's energy comes from natural gas, the supply of which is expected to last only thirty years.

== History ==
=== 1998-2007 ===
The project began in 1998 with a feasibility study titled, "Preliminary Feasibility Study of Hutgyi Hydropower Project in the Union of Myanmar". The study recommended the construction of a "a low height, run-of-river dam having a capacity of 300 MW". In November 2005, however, Thailand's energy minister cited a newer feasibility which stated that the dam could handle a capacity of up to 1,200 megawatts of power.

In 2004, survey work began on the project. However, when two EGAT employees were killed in May of that year, one from a grenade and the other from a landmine, the project was halted. In December 2005, in preparation for a series of dam investments along the Salween River, a memorandum of understanding (MOU) was signed between Myanmar's Hydro Electric Power Department and Thailand's EGAT. In June of the following year, another memorandum of understanding was signed, which this time included Sinohydro, in addition to Myanmar and EGAT. Shortly thereafter, work commenced on road repairs near the dam site. In these MOUs, Myanmar and Thailand agreed to keep all data and joint studies on the dam "strictly confidential".

Work on the project once again stalled when an EGAT staff member was killed in 2007. Work resumed on the project in 2008. Looking at the concurrent developments in the region's ethnic conflicts, the Karen National Liberation Army Peace Council (KNLAPC), which was founded by the commander of the Karen National Liberation Army's 7th Brigade, signed a peace agreement with Myanmar's State Peace and Development Council (SPDC) in February 2007.

=== 2008-2010 ===
In 2008, another MOU was signed, this time between Myanmar and Sinohydro, which established Sinohydro as the majority shareholder in the dam project. June 2009 saw another uptick in violence, as the DKBA and the army began an offensive against the KNU. Because of this offensive, around 4,000 Karen villagers were forced to flee their homes. This was the largest refugee influx from Karen to Thailand in over a decade.

Across the border during the same year, Thailand's Office of the Prime Minister formed a subcommittee to look into and monitor the potential human rights impacts of the Hatgyi project. In 2010, the subcommittee recommended more extensive studies on the local impacts of the dam project, focusing especially on the impact of the project on Thailand. The recommendation claimed the existing environmental impact assessment (EIA) did not focus enough on the implications of the project for Thailand. Nothing ever came of these recommendations, however.

Since the 1990s, when it broke off from the Christian-dominated Karen National Union, the Democratic Karen Buddhist Army had been cooperating with the Myanmar Army. However, in 2010, Saw La Pwe formed an anti-government breakaway faction of the DKBA.

=== 2011-present ===
Public hearings regarding the construction of the dam were held in the Sop Moei District of northern Thailand in 2011. Attendance was high. In December of that year, the Karen National Union reluctantly agreed to allow further surveys to be conducted for the dam. In January of the following year, a temporary ceasefire was signed between the national army and the KNU. Only two months later, however, there was a noticeable build-up of army troops in the area around the dam site.

Around this time, Jin Honggen, economic and commercial counselor at China's Myanmar embassy, related the concern of many Chinese investors at the lack of progress in a variety of investment projects, including the Hatgyi Dam. He stated that, "some Chinese companies in Myanmar, especially those investing in resource fields, are worrying their interests can't be secured".

In late-February 2013, Myanmar's deputy minister of electric power told parliament that the Hatgyi Dam was one of six dams whose construction had been approved. Less than two months later, in April, local villagers first reported visible evidence of the project getting underway, claiming that EGAT was setting up water measurement posts at the Hatgyi Dam site. At the same time, Myanmar's military presence in the area was as high as ever, as witnesses reported the presence of eight army battalions near the dam site. Meanwhile, the DKBA was forced to evacuate the dam area in May. As of September 2014, troop deployments to the dam site continued in order to increase security.

== Controversy ==
=== Impact on local populations ===
Concerns about the impact of the dam on local populations have largely revolved around the displacement of numerous villages due to flooding, and the lack of involvement of local communities in the decision-making process.

In 2013, the Karen National Union explained to local villagers that nine Karen villages would be flooded and damaged as a result of the Hatgyi Dam. Karen Rivers Watch (KRW) pegs the number of displaced villages at 21. EJ Atlas estimates the potential affected population to range from 1,000 to 30,000 local residents, with listed impacts including displacement, loss of livelihood, and loss of culture. Saw Kyaw Phoe of Mae Par Village explained: "If the dam is built, our village, the whole area, including our paddy farms and our gardens will be flooded. I, myself, will have no place to live."

An open letter written by Karen Rivers Watch in 2011 stated that the dam would only exacerbate problems associated with the displacement of war-torn communities, with very little benefit actually being received by the local community, as the majority of the power generated by the dam would be exported.

Paul Sein Twa, director of the Karen Environmental and Social Action Network (KESAN) pointed out that, "Local people do not want any dams on the Salween River, especially in Karen State, without the free, prior and informed consent of impacted communities." Along those lines, the aforementioned KRW open letter expressed that there had been "little consultation with affected communities" and that the majority of the local populations opposed the dam.

The higher military presence in the area associated with the construction and maintenance of the Hatgyi Dam has also been a source of concern and criticism. Naw Paw Gay, of the KRW, explained that, "the presence of the Burmese troops will lead to more human rights abuses." Saw Kyaw Phoe, meanwhile, while commenting on the negative implications of increased troops in the area to protect the dam, related that the Myanmar army would, "force villagers to carry their food ration and ammunition and to lead Burmese troops through land mined areas."

=== Disruption of peace negotiations ===
International Rivers claims that the dam project has been obstructing peace negotiations between the Karen National Union and the Myanmar Army. Likewise, the Democratic Karen Buddhist Army's tactical operations commander Colonel Saw Maung Kyar explained that, "problems will get worse if [the government] starts increasing the military forces by using the dam as an excuse." Meanwhile, the joint secretary of the Karen National Union, P'Doh Saw That Thi Bwe, argued that, "the Hatgyi hydropower project is located in our land. Our stand is not to allow such kind of big project until we have a guarantee for discussing politics."

=== Environmental impact ===
Environmental researcher Steve Thompson of the Karen Environmental and Social Action Network (KESAN) commented on the Hatgyi Dam by explaining that the dam could, "wipe out many or most riverine fish species, with serious socio-economic consequences for local villagers". An open letter by the Karen Rivers Watch in 2011 described the Hatgyi Dam site as being in an "ecologically sensitive area", close to an active fault line. EJ Atlas listed environmental impacts as including flooding, biodiversity loss, soil, pollution, and deforestation.
