= Defence of the Salween River =

Japanese attempt to invade Yunnan in 1942

Defense of the Salween River, battle of West Yunnan
- Part of Second Sino-Japanese War Japanese invasion of Burma and the Burma campaign in the South-East Asian theatre of World War II
Date	May 1942
Location	Longling, Wanding, Huitong bridge on the Salween River, Yunnan
Result	Japan is defeated in its attempt to cross the east bank of the Salween River into Baoshan, only partially occupying some territory west of the Salween River.; The Japanese 56th Division did not establish a firm foothold in Western Yunnan but defeated the counterattack of the Chinese 71st Army towards Tengchong and Longling, pushing most of the Chinese Army to the other side of the Salween River.

Belligerents
Republic of China; United States American Volunteer Group	(Empire of Japan) Japan

Commanders and leaders
(Republic of China (1912–1949)) Song Xilian (Republic of China (1912–1949)) General Peter Mow; United States David Lee "Tex" Hill	(Empire of Japan) Major General Sakaguchi Shizuo

Strength
Republic of China 36th, 88th, and 2nd Reserve Divisions of the 71st Army, 12 Hawk III fighters and Soviet manufactured bomber planes United States 4 P-40E bombers, 3rd Squadron (4 Hawk 81 fighters) in the first raid on 7 May, 8 Hawk 81 fighters and an unspecified amount of P-40E bombers in the second raid on 8 May, 6 P-40Es and 6 Hawk 81s in the third raid on 10 May	(Empire of Japan) Sakaguchi Task Force of the 56th division, unknown numbers of tankettes and trucks: Initial attacks on Tengchong and Huitong Bridge : 2nd and 3rd Battalions of the 146th Infantry Regiment

Casualties and losses
Chinese claims : 36th Division at the east bank of the Salween River (May 5 to May 9, 1942) : 2 battalion commanders, more than 10 company and platoon commanders, and more than 500 soldiers casualties. 71st Army in the Chinese counterattack : considerable casualties from each of its units: 2nd Reserve Division : 22 officers and 626 soldiers killed, wounded, or missing.; 107th and 108th Regiments of the 36th Division and the 262nd, 263rd, and 264th Regiments of the 88th Division : all suffered heavy casualties.; Japanese claims : In the battle along the Salween River (May 5 to May 9, 1942) : 500 killed. In the Chinese counterattack (May 21 to May 31, 1942) : 1,335 killed, 36 POWs.	Japanese claims : Sakaguchi task force in the battle along the Salween River (May 5 to May 9, 1942) : zero casualties. Garrison of the 56th Division north of Wanding under enemy aircraft attack (May 10, 1942) : 8 killed, 8 wounded, 2 vehicles destroyed. 56th Division in the mopping-up phase (May 10 to May 14, 1942) : (Note: Including against enemy aircraft squadrons) zero casualties. 56th Division in the Chinese counterattack (May 21 to May 31, 1942) : 70 killed, 176 wounded. American claims: Entire columns of Japanese tanks and trucks destroyed at the Salween, Longling, and Wanding AVG records for the air to air battle over Baoshan: 8 Japanese fighters shot down Japanese records: 2 Japanese Ki-30 Type 97 light bombers from the 27th Sentai shot down, 3 Japanese Ki-27 Type 97 fighters from the 11th Sentai shot down

The Defense of the Salween River was the failed Japanese attempt to invade and cross the Salween River into Baoshan, Yunnan followed by the Chinese's failed counterattack to regain Tengchong and Longling.

== Background ==
Britain also refused to build a railway from Burma to Yunnan province in China in 1938 which would ship war material. Foreign war supplies destined for China were stuck in Rangoon in 1939–1940, since Britain refused to allow fighter aircraft and trainers that China bought from foreign companies enter China via British Burma since Britain wanted to retain good relations with Japan.

The western Yunnan Longling and Tengchong Superintendent was warlord Long Yun's son Long Shengwu.

On 4 May, Longling was occupied by Japan. Yunnan warlord Long Yun's son Long Shengwu, the Tenglong supervisor, had three battalions consisting of 1,000 warlord soldiers in Tengchong, they abandoned the city on 6 May 1942 and Tengyue county magistrate Qiu Tianpei abandoned the city on 8 May 1942 leaving remaining troops leaderless and causing them to withdraw north, leaving no troops in the city and leaving the gates of the city walls wide open, days before the Japanese arrived. On 10 May 1942 the Japanese arrived at Tengchong city which had no troops manning the walls and the gate was open. On 15 May, Chiang Kai-shek sent three regiments of his own central army's Second Reserve Division north of Tengchong at Jiatou, after crossing the Salween River and they started enclosing the area around Tengchong to siege the Japanese. In Jiatou, they set up a training school for military cadres which enlisted refugees from Tengchong to train them for war, including political officer Shao Ying-jen who was 18.

== Battle ==
=== Bioweapons attack ===
Imperial Japanese Army Air Service dropped bubonic plague and cholera bombs on Baoshan on 4 May. An American pilot also witnessed disease caused by Japanese bioweapons in west Yunnan.

=== AVG accounts of air operations ===
Japanese fighters and bombers engaged in aerial combat over Baoshan with the AVG, with AVG claiming 8 Japanese fighters killed and Japanese admitting to losing 3 Ki-27 Type 97 fighters and 2 Ki-30 Type 97 light bombers. The Japanese gathered abandoned British and Chinese trucks for logistics. Wanding and Kutkai (35 miles from Lashio to the north) were the site of delaying battles fought by Chinese to slow down the Japanese as they readied positions east of the Salween River, where they demolished the Huitong bridge and retreated to by 5 May. The Japanese general Sakaguchi ordered Japanese troops to cross the Salween to conquer the east bank of the river, refusing to stop at the Salween and the AVG believed he intended to continue on to Kunming. The AVG sent a telegram to Chongqing asking for permission to attack the Japanese column by air to stop them from crossing the Salween ("Request authority to attack targets in between Salween and Lungling City."), and were given permission by the government in Chongqing to attack all boats and trucks between Longling and the Salween ("The generalissimo instructs you send all available AVG attack trucks, boats, etc., between Salween and Lungling City.").

The Boston Globe said ""On one side of the river stretched Japanese tanks, armored cars and lorries, packed close together and almost touching. On the other was a long column of stationary Chinese trucks,"

Japanese truck convoys were attacked by 6 Chinese army air force Tupolev SB-3 bombers on 6 May, but the bombers had to return to Kunming after a single mission since they were too broken down to continue. AVG pilots "Tex" Hill, Tom Jones, Frank Lawlor and Ed Rector were sent to fly P-40E Warhawks to dive bomb the Japanese trucks and bomb the Burma road itself to create an obstacle for the trucks. To carry Russian made 570-pound high-explosive bombs, the P-40Es were fitted with custom made centreline racks made by Chuck Baisden and Roy Hoffman, so they each carried a single 570-pound demolition bomb under the body of the bomber in addition to multiple 35-pound fragmentation bombs under each wing of the bomber. They were escorted by 4 Hawk 81s from the 3rd Squadron led by Arvid Olsen. They attacked on 7 May, flying from Kunming to Yunnanyi and then to the Salween where they say the Japanese 56th division's soldiers and trucks below. A pontoon bridge under construction by Japanese engineers was spotted by Hill from his bomber. Hill blocked the Burma road with rocks by bombing the gorge to make rocks fall onto the road and the other bombers followed him to block the road. A Japanese column was then targeted with fragmentation bombs by Hill and the three other bombers. The bombers then used their machine guns to strafe the Japanese until they ran out of bullets and then left and let the fighter planes continue strafing the Japanese since they no longer needed to guard the bombers. Chinese troops on the east bank of the Salween watched. On 8 May, 8 Hawk 81 fighter escorts led by R. T Smith again led another group of P-40E bombers led by Tom Jones to attack the Japanese column, with the bombers destroying 50 Japanese trucks. There were no attacks on 9 May due to weather, but the Chinese forces started ground attacks against the Japanese across the Salween River. The Japanese at Longling were attacked when the Salween River was crossed north of the former destroyed Huitong bridge by the Chinese 71st Army's 87th and 36th divisions as the Japanese were "off balance". The Japanese were attempting to construct their pontoon bridge with their artillery and tanks waiting. The Chinese air force under General Peter Mow also participated in the battle. The Japanese survivors from the strafings and bombings after AVG's second raid were attacked by Chinese on the ground.

200 Japanese casualties were estimated in the 50 trucks hit on the 8 May raid by Lew Bishop. American journalist and war historian Daniel Ford said that the Japanese advanced was finally halted by the Chinese ground troops action on Saturday, 9 May rather than by the air campaign waged by AVG. The Japanese progress was halted by the Chinese 71st Army's two divisions counter strikes across the river.

The Japanese supply trucks were forced to flee back to the Burmese border since the Sakaguchi Detachment's logistical line was under threat by the Chinese 36th division attack across the Salween river on 9 May. The Chinese landed on the west bank of the Salween towards the north of where the Japanese attempted to build their pontoon.

The Japanese column of vehicles stretched from the Salween all the way to Longling for miles, flanked on both sides with sheer bluffs and a rock wall, so the AVG and Chinese air wing were able to strafe and bomb them for four days with nowhere for the trapped Japanese to hide after the AVG blocked their escape routes to their front and rear by causing landslides by bombing the rock wall. At the road south of Longling Frank Schiel let a group of fighters to attack Japanese light tanks. A fuel carrying column of Japanese trucks was wiped out.

"Tex" Hill talked about the first raid on 7 May: "The monsoon season had already set in and we encountered some mighty rough weather before finally breaking out on the target side of the weather. We installed jury-rigged bomb racks to accommodate a new 570-lb. Russian high-explosive bomb on the bellies of our new P-40Es and fragmentation bombs mounted on the wing racks. Hill talked about how they blocked the road with rocks: "The bombs we dropped impacted on the top of the Salween gorge, completely trapping some of the many pieces of armor and equipment, as well as personnel, at the bottom of the gorge. We knocked off some of the road there, and it blocked them, and then we were able to strafe them."

Jim Howard say about the 8 May raid: "We glided down and released our bombs in string along portions of the Jap side of the road. My bombs landed squarely along about 200 yds. of road with Jap trucks bumper to bumper to bumper." and "black smoke and flame showed the results" Tom Jones talked about destroying Japanese trucks near the river that he said carried pontoon bridge pieces, and the Japanese refused to set them up during day time and would only start working at "night or when opposition from Chin[ese] soldiers across river should let up." He said the "destruction of these trucks, I believe, will hold up the Jap's plans for some time." and that the Japanese were in "general confusion," "[returning] fire with small arms after second pass by our planes." C. H. Laughlin said "dispersed trucks hid in brush on mountainside." and "dropped 2 bombs and observed large petrol fire" while Japanese "troops scrambling down side of hill away from trucks: dropped two more bombs and razed convoy with machine gun fire." He then strafed "small units of cars and trucks." twice more,

Japanese on the western slopes of the gorge were also bombed and strafed by Chinese pilots in 12 Hawk III fighters and Soviet manufactured bomber planes.

Japanese trucks further behind Longling were then bombed and strafed by 6 P-40Es and 6 Hawk 81s under R. T. Smith the day after that on 10 May. Smith said "It seems the Chinese are driving the Japs back down the road now, Hope it continues that direction.” The Japanese lost the battle to cross the Salween, despite the AVG in the air and Chinese ground forces on the east bank of the Salween having zero coordination with each other and they were attacking the Japanese completely independently, not communicating or sharing plans.

The pilots "threw everything we had against the Salween gorge and the Burma Road." The Washington Post mentioned the Chinese ground assaults across the Sawleen: "Chinese reinforcements were flung across the stream, and in a bitter struggle the main Japanese forces were thrust back . . . and the remnants . . were wiped out."

The Japanese completely stopped their attempts to advance beyond the Salween on 11 May. Japanese trucks then started retreating towards Burma. On 12 May the AVG reported that a large Japanese columns of 75-100 trucks was fleeing south, the leading truck of the column was south of Wanting while the last truck of the column was just at the entrance of the city at the other end, the entire column spanned Wanting city and was strafed and bombed by the AVG.

AVG Kittyhawks led by Adam and Eves were ordered on 22 May to bomb the remnants of the Sakaguchi detachment still clinging to the Salween's west bank.

=== Newspaper account of ground operations ===
Up to 15 May near Hungmushu in west Yunnan, Chinese attacks destroyed half of a Japanese column who were forced to flee back to the Burma Road. Chinese continued fighting in northeast Burma, along the Salween River and south of Longling..

On the Sunday before 18 May, Chinese attacks drove back a Japanese column from Longlong going northeast towards the Salween River and the Japanese column lost half its men. Chinese forces also fought Japanese to the south and southeast of Monghai and Monglen.

On 17 May, 27 miles west of Baoshan, a Japanese column was attacked and forced to flee back to Tengchong by a Chinese column that went across the Salween River. On the banks of the Salween to the east of Longling, Japanese and Chinese engaged in an artillery duel firing at each other across the river. The American Volunteer Group on 16 May bombed Japanese trains from Indo-China to Yunnan while Chinese planes bombed Japanese southwest of Longling at Mangshih during heavy rain.

On 18 May a Japanese column heading towards the Salween River were attacked by the Chinese at Kengtung and Longling. At the southeast of Kengtung Chinese drove the Japanese back twice.

A caravan road lay between Tengchong and Baoshan with the Salween River between the road. Japan sent a column to Tengchong from Longling and then to the Salween and another column directly to the Salween. The Chinese then sent a column to cross the river from Baoshan and attacked the Japanese column from Tengchong, forcing the Japanese to flee back to Tengchong. The other Japanese column directly from Longling was also repulsed back to Longling after being constantly attacked by the Chinese.

The line of control froze at the Salween for 2 years after Japan's failed attempt at crossing it, until Chinese reconquered all territory west of the Salween in 1944. Japanese soldiers on the west bank of the Salween were unable to attack or harm Chinese civilians just 100 yards away on the east bank of the Salween in that entire time.

=== Chinese accounts ===
In May 1942, the Chinese Expeditionary Force was defeated in the Burma Campaign. During the retreat, the Chinese blew up the Huitong Bridge on May 5. The 36th Division of the 71st Army, which was ordered to reinforce the retreating Expeditionary Force, successfully blocked the advance unit of the 56th Division on the banks of the Salween River with cooperation with the AVG. At this time, the Chinese Military Commission made an incorrect assessment that the Japanese force advancing along the Burma Road was a hastily-formed unit of 2,000 to 3,000 troops. Therefore, on May 11, the Military Commission ordered the 11th Group Army to counterattack Tengchong and Longling to recapture lost territories in Western Yunnan.

On May 22, Chiang ordered the 36th, 88th, and 2nd Reserve Divisions to sweep the Japanese troops west of the Salween River and retake Longling and Tengchong within three days, threatening punishments on Song and the three divisional commanders if they failed. However, after crossing the Salween River that day, the 71st Army could not make any progress against the Japanese defenses. The next day, Chiang sent several more telegrams criticizing Song for his inability in retaking the cities. The 11th Group Army’s counteroffensive was poorly prepared, lacked artillery to destroy enemy fortifications, and was lacking in supplies. Japanese reinforcements, especially the 113th Infantry Regiment, arrived successively to counterattack the Chinese offensive. After five days of fierce fighting, the 11th Group Army were only able to capture a few small strongholds and in exchange had lost a considerable number of men from each of its units, with the 2nd Reserve Division alone losing one regiment commander, five company commanders and twenty-six platoon commanders, and more than half of the NCOs and soldiers among its 5th and 6th Regiments that crossed the Salween River.

On May 28, the 1st Battalion of the 107th Regiment of the 36th Division reported the killing of a Japanese officer (Note: Lieutenant Colonel Kaneyasu Iribe, commander of the 2nd Battalion of the 113th Infantry Regiment, according to the detailed battle report of the 11th Group Army. However, Lieutenant Colonel Kaneyasu Iribe did not die in this battle and would be killed in action near the end of the war.) and the seizure of documents at Songshan which showed that the 56th Division had entered western Yunnan and set up six garrison areas at Tengchong, Lameng (Songshan), Longling, Mangshi, Pingxia, and Wanding. The total strength was estimated to be between 15,000 and 20,000. These documents were quickly submitted, and Chiang Kai-shek ordered a halt to the offensive on May 31. The main force of the 11th Group Army withdrew to the east bank of the Salween River while a small force stayed at the west bank to wage guerilla warfare. The Burma Road battlefield turned into stalemate along the Salween River.

=== Japanese account ===
The 56th Division only referred to the attempted crossing of the Salween River briefly before the Sakaguchi task force captured Tengchong on May 10. The division recorded no losses during this period. Senshi Sōsho also only briefly described the battle process at the Salween River front in early May 1942. At the time of the Chinese counteroffensive towards Lameng and Longling on May 24, the 56th Division had one battalion of the 146th Infantry Regiment, two battalions of the 18th Field Heavy Artillery Regiment, and one battalion of the 3rd Field Heavy Artillery Regiment stationed at Lameng and the headquarters of the Sakaguchi task force, one engineer company, and a field hospital stationed at Longling. Without any infantry units, Sakaguchi and his troops in Longling were in a difficult struggle against enemy forces from the south. Upon learning of the situation, divisional commander Watanabe gathered all nearby units and ordered the 113th Infantry Regiment which had been mopping-up Allied forces in Burma to advance towards Longling. The 15th Army, now prioritizing the battle process at the Salween River front, ordered three infantry battalions, one mountain artillery battalion, one engineer company, and one field hospital of the 18th Division to be put under the command of the 56th Division. With the 113th Infantry Regiment at the front, the Japanese defeated the Chinese at Longling and Lameng then proceeded to mop-up the enemy. By June 10, most of the enemy troops had been cleared from the right bank of the Salween River.

The Japanese Army did not record this as a tough battle. However, one high-ranking officer was killed in action in this battle. Lieutenant Colonel Tamura, the commander of the 18th Field Heavy Artillery Regiment attached to the Sakaguchi Detachment, was killed by Chinese machine gun fire northeast of Songshan at the Yunnan-Burma Road on May 24, just a few days after taking command of the Lameng garrison. Additionally, the Japanese source recorded that the 2nd Battalion of the 146th Infantry Regiment was the unit sent to capture Tengchong. The 2nd and 3rd Battalions of the same regiment were also the units which attempted to cross the Salween River and compete with the Chinese 36th Division at the east bank after the 24th Independent Engineer Battalion blew up the Huitong bridge.

== Religious and ethnic minorities ==
Hui Muslims like Yuan Yizhi and her family, who were living in Burma, fled from Burma to Baoshan in Yunnan, but her younger sister, younger brother and husband were killed by Japanese bombing in Baoshan on 4 May 1942.

The Japanese faced violent resistance from ethnic minority Dai in west Yunnan, like Dai prince Dao Baotu and the Dai regent of Mengmao and Mangshi, Feng Kesheng.

Palaung people (De'ang), Lisu, Miao, Achang, Kachin (Jingpo), Hui, Dai, Bai, Yi participated in building the Burma road.

Kachin women and men helped work on repairs on the Burma Road, carrying logs. A film was released in 1941 around Baoshan in Yunnan showing Kachin workers on the road. Dai (Shan) people lived in the same area and were filmed too.

Trucks started moving along the Burma road in 1941. China kept drums of tung oil along the Burma road in Yunnan.

== Post battle bombings ==
On 8 July 1942, Japanese in Tengchong were bombed by Colonel Caleb Vance Haynes in a B-52. Several hundred Japanese were claimed to have been killed by strafing by 2 P-40 fighters and the B-24 flown by Haynes. Haynes commanded the India Air Task Force. Haynes was in charge of the Assam-Burma-China ferry. Haynes delivered orders to Stillwell to evacuate from Shwebo in Burma.

== Aftermath ==
In July 1942, county magistrate Zhang Wende claimed that the Japanese had not built fortifications in Tengchong and urged the Second Reserve Division to immediately storm Tengchong but was not heeded. In reality, after the Japanese capture of Tengchong, the 56th Division stationed its 146th and 148th Infantry Regiments in and around the city while the Chinese had only the 5th and 6th Regiments of the 2nd Reserve Division and the county's self-defense unit facing them. In September 1942 the Japanese garrison was bolstered by a battalion from the 113th Infantry Regiment.

In response to guerilla activities around Tengchong, the 56th Division conducted multiple mopping-up operations throughout the year. In May and June of 1942 alone, the 56th Division claimed 477 abandoned corpses and 31 POWs while suffering 32 killed and 26 wounded against mostly guerilla units of the 36th, 88th, and 2nd Reserve Divisions. The most notable battle was on July 30, 1942, where an orderly unit of 50 men and 10 rifles of the Tengchong garrison were ambushed south of Luohanchong by several dozen Chinese troops from an unknown guerilla unit, resulting in 18 killed, 2 wounded, and 1 missing. The Japanese did not claim any enemy casualties in this ambush.

== See also ==
- Yenangyaung
- Battle of Toungoo
- Chinese Army in India
- New 1st Army
- Du Yuming
- Sun Liren
- National Revolutionary Army

== Sources ==
- Hsu Long-hsuen and Chang Ming-kai, History of The Sino-Japanese War (1937–1945), 2nd Ed., 1971. Translated by Wen Ha-hsiung, Chung Wu Publishing; 33, 140th Lane, Tung-hwa Street, Taipei, Taiwan Republic of China. Pg. 377
- Slim, William (1956). Defeat into Victory. London: Cassell. ISBN 0-304-29114-5.
