= Mawkmai State =

Former Shan State in Burma

Coordinates: 20°13′36″N 97°43′30″E

Mawkmai (Maukme) မောက်မယ်နယ်
- State of the Shan States
- 1767–1959
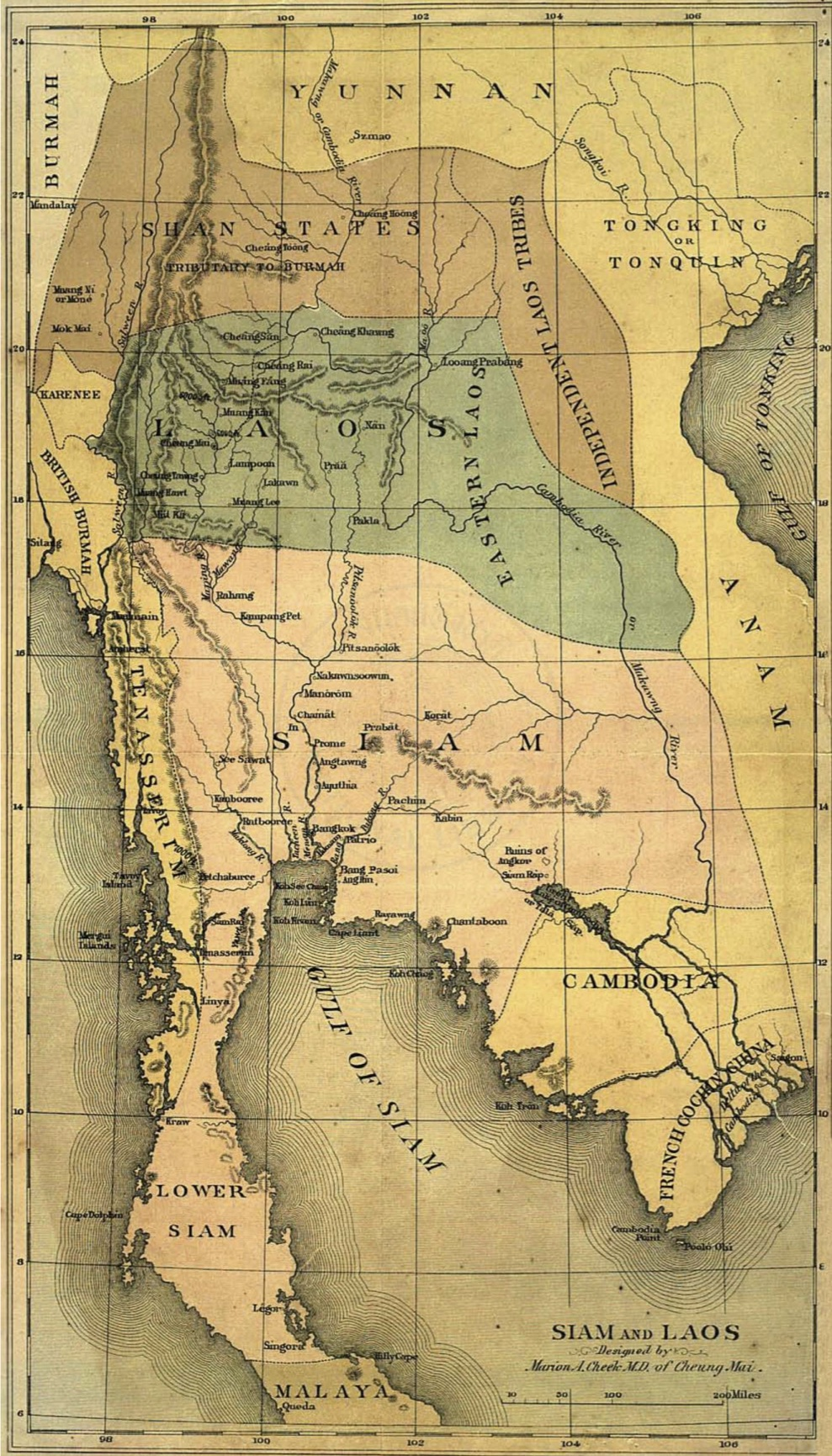
- Mawkmai (Mok Mai) in a 19th-century map of the Shan States
- Capital: Mawkmai
- Area
  - 1901: 4,487 km^{2} (1,732 sq mi)
- Population
  - 1901: 29,454
- History
  - State founded: 1767
  - Abdication of the last Saopha: 1959
Succeeded by
Shan State; Mae Hong Son Province

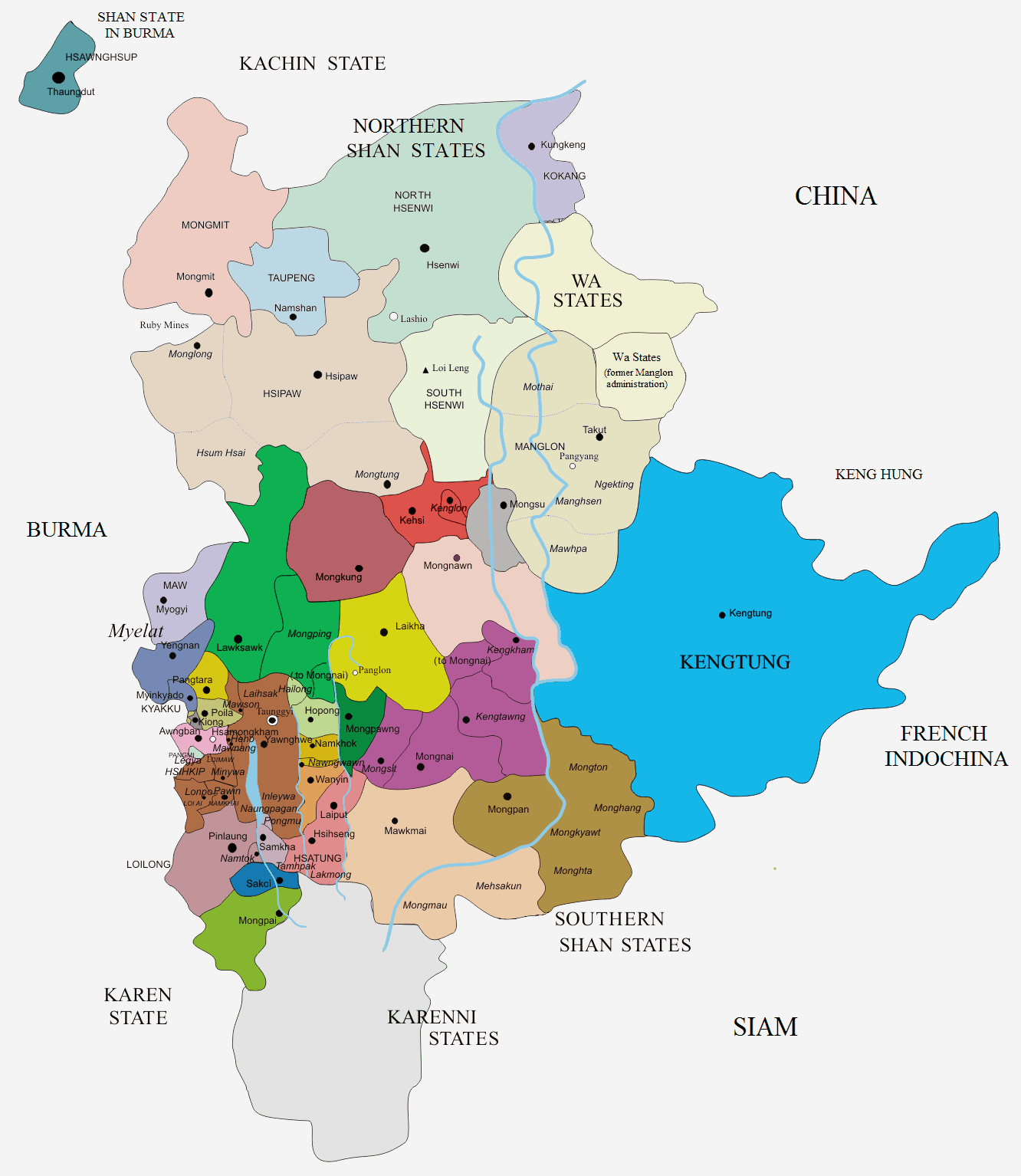
Map of the Shan States showing the two trans-Salween districts that were claimed by Thailand in WW II

Mawkmai, also known as Maukme (Burmese: မောက်မယ်), was a Shan State in what is today Burma. It belonged to the Eastern Division of the Southern Shan States.

== History ==
Mawkmai state was founded in 1767 by Hsai Khiao, hailing from a noble family of the city of Chiang Mai. According to tradition a predecessor state named Lokavadi had existed previously in the area.

As a result of the Anglo-Siamese Boundary Commission of 1892-93 the Möngmaü and Mehsakun trans-Salween districts, claimed by Siam as territories located on the eastern side of the Salween River, were kept as part of Mawkmai state, but Mae Hong Son district was ceded to Siam.

In 1942, the Imperial Japanese Army accompanied by the Thai Phayap Army invaded the Federated Shan States from Thailand. The defense of the Shan States had been left to the Nationalist Chinese forces, upon the request of the British. The 93rd Division of the Chinese Army defended the Keng Tung, while the 249th and 55th Divisions guarded from the Kengtung to Karenni States along the Thai border. The Japanese forces with superior air power went on to dislodge the Nationalist Chinese forces by November 1942. The IJA allowed the Phayap Army to occupy all of Kengtung State and the four districts of Möng Tang, Möng Hang, Möng Kyawt and Möng Hta of Mongpan State. Following the existing agreement between Thai Prime Minister Plaek Phibunsongkhram (Phibun) and the Japanese Empire, on 18 August 1943, the Japanese government agreed to the Thai annexation of Kengtung and part of Mongpan state (as well as the annexation of Kelantan, Trengganu, Kedah, Perlis states and nearby islands in Malaya.) The Thai government wanted the two districts of Möngmaü and Mehsakun of Mawkmai of the southern Shan states as well as part of Kantarawadi in the Karenni states, all located east of the Salween River, but the Japanese assigned them to their client State of Burma in September 1943.

Following the defeat and surrender of the Japanese Empire, Thailand left the territories it had annexed to the north in 1945. However, the Thai government officially relinquished its claim over Mawkmai State only in 1946 as part of the condition for admission to the United Nations and the withdrawal of all wartime sanctions for having sided with the Axis powers.

=== Rulers ===
The rulers of the state bore the title Saopha. Ritual style Kambawsa Rahta Mahawuntha Thiriraza.

- 1767 - c.1800 Hsai Khiao
- 1800 - 1818 Hsai Kyaw
- 1818 - 1824 Awk Hkun
- 1824 - 1831 Let To
- 1831 - 1844 Hkam U
- 1844 - 1867 Ko Lan (1st time) (d. 1887)
- 1867 - 1868 Hkum Hmôm I
- 1868 - 1887 Ko Lan (2nd time) (s.a.)
- 1887 - 1888 Hkun Hmôm II (1st time) (b. c.1864 - d. 1899)
- Mar 1888 - 1888 Hkun Noi Kyu
- 1888 - 1899 Hkun Hmôm II (2nd time)
- 1899 - 30 Nov 1906 Hkun Htun Peng (b. 1883 - d. 1906)
- 1899 - 1904 Hkun Ne -Regent (1st time) (b. 1865 - d. 19..)
- 30 Nov 1906 - 1917 Hkun Leng (b. 1898 - d. 1915)
- 30 Nov 1906 - 1909 Hkun Ne -Regent (2nd time) (s.a.)
- 1917 - 1952 Hkun Hkaing

== See also ==
- Anglo-Siamese Treaty of 1909
