= Mawkmai Township =

- Township
- Location in Langkho district

- Location in Burma
- Coordinates: 20°14′N 97°44′E
- Country: Burma
- State: Shan State
- District: Langkho District
- Time zone: UTC+6.30 (MST)

Mawkmai Township is a township of Langkho District in the Shan State of Burma. The principal town is Mawkmai.

The central portion of the township consists of a wide, well-watered plain on which rice is grown. The rest is chiefly mountainous with ranges running north and south. Rice is the chief crop, but much tobacco of good quality is grown in the Langko district on the Tang River. There is also a great deal of cattle-breeding.

== History ==
Mawkmai State was one of the former large states in the eastern division of the southern Shan States of Burma with an area of 7,215 km².
