= Namtok State =

Former state in Myanmar

Coordinates: 19°59′20″N 96°58′23″E

Namtok was a Shan state in what is today Burma. It belonged to the Myelat Division of the Southern Shan States.
