= Wān Long =

- Village
- Location in Burma
- Coordinates: 20°2′N 97°32′E
- Country: Burma
- State: Shan State
- District: Loilen District
- Township: Mawkmai Township
- Time zone: UTC+6.30 (MST)

Wān Long is a village in Mawkmai Township, Loilen District, in the Shan State of eastern Burma. It is located southeast of Hkengnang, east of Mak and northwest of Daw Mawkla.

== History ==
A camp was located here during World War II. At 5 pm local time on 11 November 1996, SURA company 152 of No 758 Brigade attacked SLORC troops near Wan Long, in Kenglom tract. The fight was brief and two Burmese soldiers died and two were wounded.
