= Loi Lan =

Mountain in Myanmar

- Location within Myanmar

Highest point
- Elevation: 2,129 m (6,985 ft)
- Listing: List of mountains in Burma
- Coordinates: 19°38′41″N 97°53′8″E

Geography
- Location: Shan State, Myanmar
- Parent range: Shan Hills

Climbing
- First ascent: unknown
- Easiest route: climb

Loi Lan is a mountain of the Shan Hills. It is located in Shan State, Burma, 75 km to the south of Langhko.

== Geography ==
Loi Lan, meaning "Bald Hill" in the Shan language, is part of a massif with multiple peaks located near the border with Thailand, about 4 km to the west of Wān Mae Aw and 15 km to the southwest of Homein.

== See also ==
- List of mountains in Burma
