= Langhko =

Langhko လၢင်းၶိူဝ်း လင်းခေးမြို့
- Town
- Lin Khae
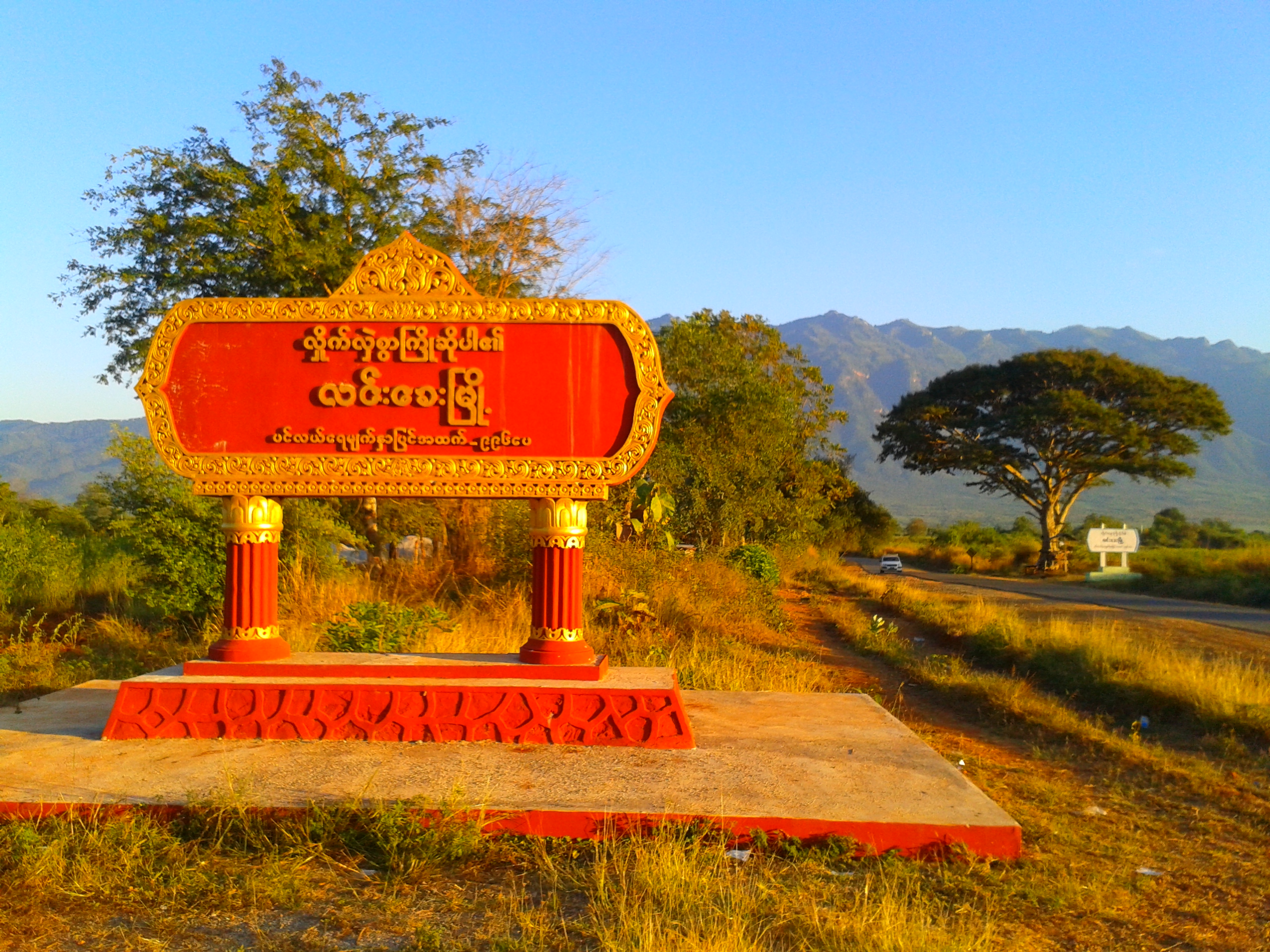

- Location in Myanmar
- Coordinates: 20°20′52″N 98°0′6″E
- Country: Myanmar
- State: Shan State
- District: Langkho District
- Township: Langkho Township

Area
  - Total: 0.54 sq mi (1.4 km^{2})
- Elevation: 996 ft (304 m)

Population (2023)
  - Total: 8,301
- Time zone: UTC+6.30 (MST)

Langkho, Laangkher, or Linkhay is a town and administrative seat of Langkho Township and Langkho District, in southern Shan State of eastern Myanmar. It is located east of Wān Long. The town is subdivided into 8 urban wards with the most populous being Taungywa ward with 2,034 people in 2023.

It is served by Langhko Airport and is accessed along the National Road 45. A bridge in the vicinity crossing the Nam Teng River the town lies on is called Nam Kok Bridge. This town is famous for being the subject of the song "Langkho A Win", written by Sai Htee Saing and sung by Bo Phyu.

== History ==
A deep channel in the area is called the Nam Teng and existed at least before 1906.

In 1940, Reverend S.W. Short and his wife set up a mission at Langhko and returned to visit it after World War II. Historically Langhko was very corrupt, occupied in the opium trade. In 1952 the town was known to be involved in tobacco production and contained a pipe making factory. The Burmese Army occupied Langkho and burned nearby villages and dispersed families to cut off aid to the Shan rebels.

== Wards ==
The eight wards of Langhko are:ref name="gad"/>

- Taungywa
- Wan Loi
- Pin Hone
- Pin Waung
- Wan Ma Pyin
- Ywa Ma Gyi (East)
- Ywa Ma Gyi (West)
- Zay Tan
