= Salween River =

Major river in Southeast Asia

Salween Shan: ၼမ်ႉၶူင်း Namkhong (IPA: [nam˦˨ˀ.kʰoŋ˥] Burmese: သံလွင်, Thanlwin (IPA: [θàɰ̃lwɪ̀ɰ̃ mjɪʔ] A Nuŋ: Anung remai Chinese: 怒江; pinyin: Nù Jiāng Thai: แม่น้ำสาละวิน, Mae Nam Salawin (IPA: [mɛ̂ː náːm sǎːləwin] Mon: ၜဳသြၚ်လောန်, " Bī Srang Loon "
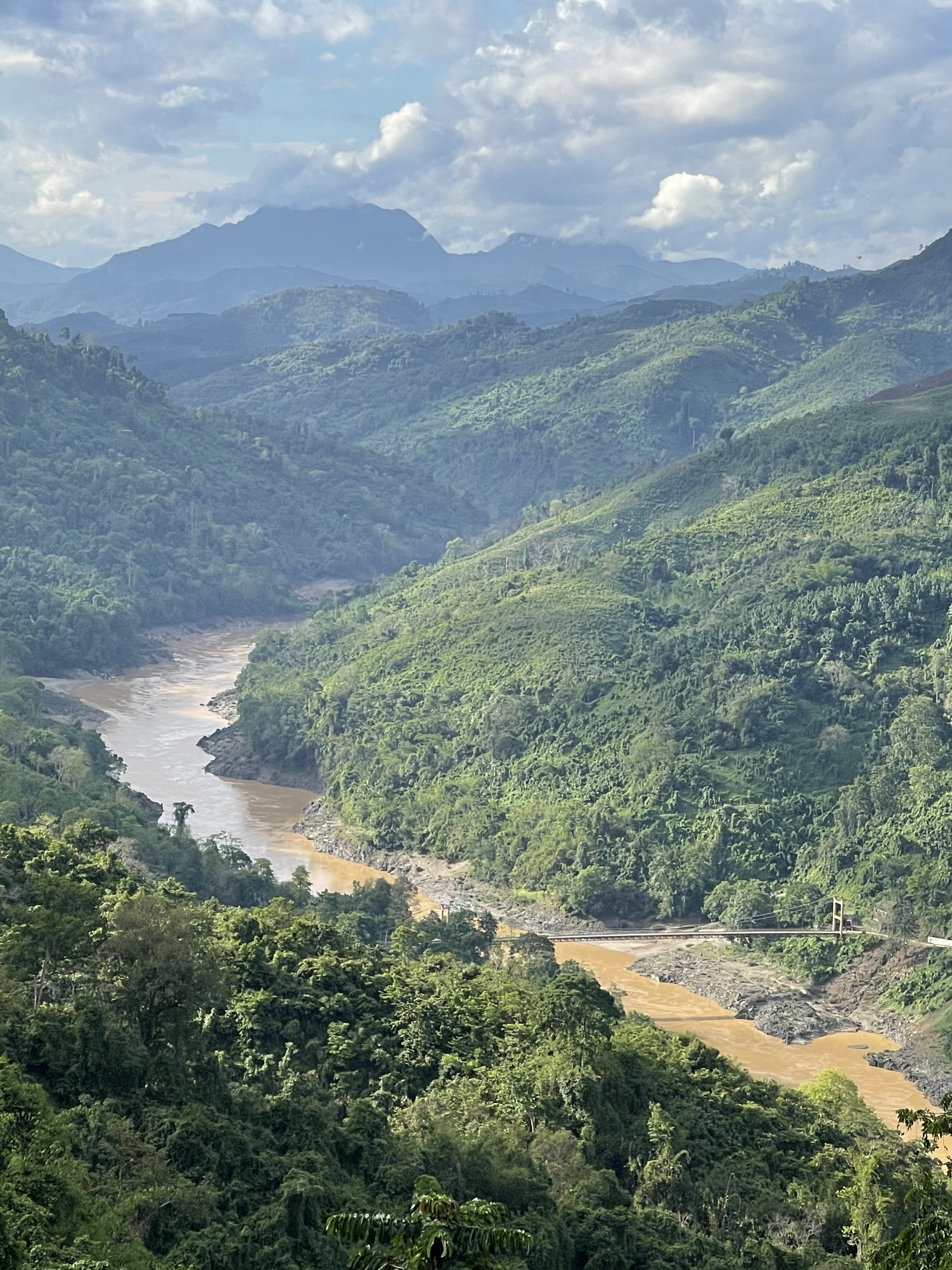
- Salween River in Shan State, Myanmar

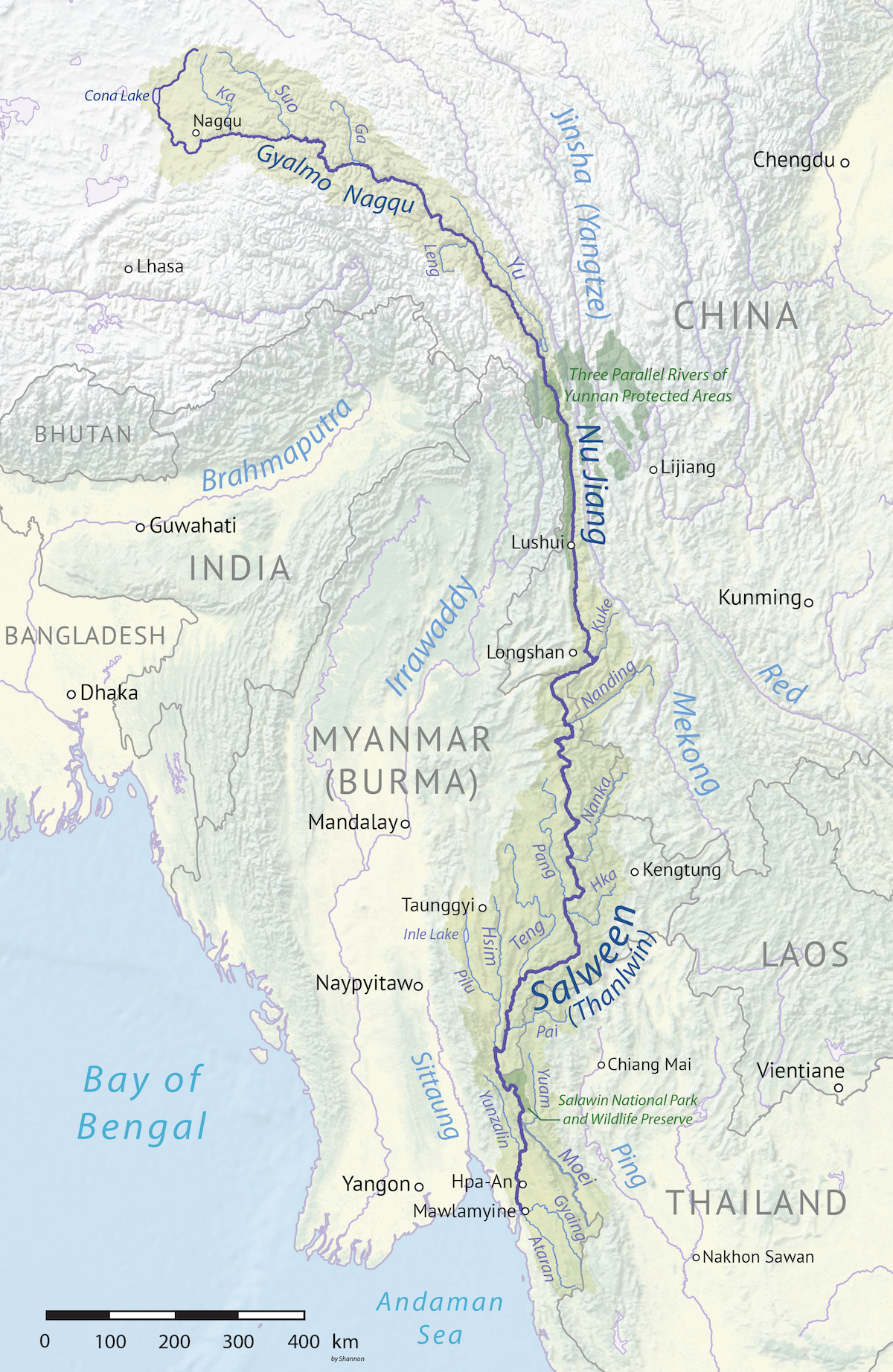
- Map of the Salween River basin
- Native name: རྒྱལ་མོ་རྔུལ་ཆུ། (Standard Tibetan); Gyalmo Ngulchu (Standard Tibetan); ကၟံင့်ယှောတ်ခၠေါဟ် (Pwo Eastern Karen); Anung remai (Anong); ဃိၣ်လီၤကျိ (S'gaw Karen); သာန်လာန် [sɑːn lɑːn] (Mon); ခြုံꩻ [kʰrum˨] (Pa'o Karen); ၼမ်ႉၶူင်း (Shan)

Location
- Country: China, Myanmar, Thailand
- Provinces (PRC): Tibet Autonomous Region, Yunnan
- States (Myanmar): Shan, Karenni (Kayah), Karen (Kayin), Mon
- Province (Thailand): Mae Hong Son

Physical characteristics
- Source: Tanggula Mountains
  - location: Nagqu, Tibet, China
  - coordinates: 32°43′47″N 92°13′58″E
  - elevation: 5,432 m (17,822 ft)
- Mouth: Andaman Sea
  - location: Mawlamyaing, Myanmar
  - coordinates: 16°11′39″N 97°35′00″E
  - elevation: 0 m (0 ft)
- Length: 3,289 km (2,044 mi)
- Basin size: 283,500 km^{2} (109,500 mi^{2})
- Discharge
  - location: Salween Delta
  - average: 6,600 m^{3}/s (210 km^{3}/a) 211 km^{3}/a (6,700 m^{3}/s)
  - minimum: 2,300 m^{3}/s (81,000 cu ft/s)
  - maximum: 32,600 m^{3}/s (1,150,000 cu ft/s)
- Discharge
  - location: Mawlamyine (Moulmein)
  - average: (Period: 1971–2000)6,391.9 m^{3}/s (225,730 cu ft/s)
- Discharge
  - location: Mottama
  - average: (Period: 1971–2000)5,217.5 m^{3}/s (184,250 cu ft/s)
- Discharge
  - location: Hpa-an
  - average: (Period: 1966–2009)169 km^{3}/a (5,400 m^{3}/s) (Period: 2009–2013)5,280 m^{3}/s (186,000 cu ft/s)
  - minimum: 1,743 m^{3}/s (61,600 cu ft/s)
  - maximum: 17,080 m^{3}/s (603,000 cu ft/s)
- Discharge
  - location: Lushui, Nujiang Lisu Autonomous Prefecture
  - average: (Period: 1971–2000)1,437 m^{3}/s (50,700 cu ft/s)

Basin features
- Progression: Andaman Sea
- River system: Salween River
- Tributaries
  - left: Suo, Ga, Hka, Hsim, Pai, Moei, Gyaing, Ataran
  - right: Ba, Leng, Pang, Teng, Pawn, Donthami

The Salween is a Southeast Asian river, about 3,289 km (2,044 mi) long, flowing from the Tibetan Plateau south into the Andaman Sea. The Salween flows primarily within southwest China and eastern Myanmar, with a short section forming the border of Myanmar and Thailand. Throughout most of its course, it runs swiftly through rugged mountain canyons. Despite the river's great length, only the last 90 km (56 mi) are navigable, where it forms a modest estuary and delta at Mawlamyine. The river is known by various names along its course, including the Thanlwin (named after Elaeocarpus sp., an olive-like plant that grows on its banks) in Myanmar and the Nu Jiang (or Nu River, named after Nu people) in China. The commonly used spelling "Salween" is an anglicisation of the Burmese name dating from 19th-century British maps.

Due to its great range of elevation and latitude coupled with geographic isolation, the Salween basin is considered one of the most ecologically diverse regions in the world. Along with the Lancang and Jinsha rivers, it flows through the Three Parallel Rivers World Heritage Site, which is believed to support over 25% of the world’s animal species. During its course the Salween provides water for agriculture and supports abundant fisheries, especially in the delta region. The Salween basin is home to numerous ethnic minority groups, whose ancestors largely originated in the Tibetan Plateau and northwest China. Starting about 5,000 years ago, people began migrating south along the river, establishing small kingdoms and city-states.

During the last 1,000 years, the Salween has defined various frontiers of the Burmese empires to the west, the Kingdom of Siam to the south, and Imperial China to the east, with the Shan States along the middle Salween being a frequently contested area. In the 19th century, the British Empire invaded Burma with Mawlamyine serving as the colonial capital for many decades. Since Burmese independence in 1948, the Salween basin has been a battleground for several fronts of the Myanmar civil war, with large areas in Shan State and Karen State (Kayin State) contested between the Myanmar military and local ethnic militias.

The Salween is one of the least fragmented large river systems in Asia, with only a few small dams in the headwaters of the river and on tributaries. The river has extremely high hydropower potential, with a fall of more than 5,000 m (16,000 ft) from its source. Since the 1970s, the Myanmar and Thai governments have sought to build massive hydroelectric dams along the river. China also planned to dam the upper Salween, but in 2016 these plans were dropped in favor of establishing a national park. The future of dam projects in Myanmar and Thailand remains uncertain.

== Geography and naming ==
The Salween basin includes about 283,500 km^{2} (109,500 mi^{2}), of which 48 percent is in China, 44 percent in Myanmar, and 8 percent in Thailand. The basin is extremely long and narrow, situated between the Irrawaddy and Brahmaputra river systems on the west and the Mekong system on the east, and sharing a shorter boundary with the Yangtze system to the north. With a mean elevation of 3,515 m (11,532 ft), the Salween basin includes numerous glaciated mountain ranges, and the river flows for much of its length at high elevation. In China, the Salween basin is situated in Tibet Autonomous Region and Yunnan. In Myanmar the Salween flows through Shan State, Karenni State, Karen State and Mon State. In Thailand the Salween borders only on Mae Hong Son province, with tributaries extending into Chiang Mai, Tak and Kanchanaburi province.

The average flow rate at the China–Myanmar border is 68.74 km^{3}/a (2,178 m^{3}/s). Along the Myanmar–Thailand border the Salween carries an average annual flow of 200 km^{3}/a (6,300 m^{3}/s). The estimated flow rate at the mouth is 6,600 m^{3}/s (230,000 cu ft/s). About 89 percent of the annual flow occurs in the monsoon season (mid-May through November), and only 11 percent in the remainder of the year.

The average volume of sediment in the Salween Delta is around 180 million tonnes per year.

The population of the Salween basin is estimated at 24 million, or 76 persons/km^{2}. About 10 million people live adjacent or close to the river proper. People of the Salween basin represent a large diversity of ethnic groups. In China, the Salween basin is home to Blang, Derung, Lisu, Nu, Palaung (De'ang), Shan, Tibetan and Wa. In Myanmar, the major ethnic groups include Akha, Lahu, Lisu, Hmong, Kachin, Karen, Karenni, Kokang, Pa'O, Shan and Yao. The highest population densities are in Mon State (300 people/km^{2}) and Yunnan (100 people/km^{2}), while the lowest population density is in Tibet (5 people/km^{2}).

=== Upper Salween (China) ===
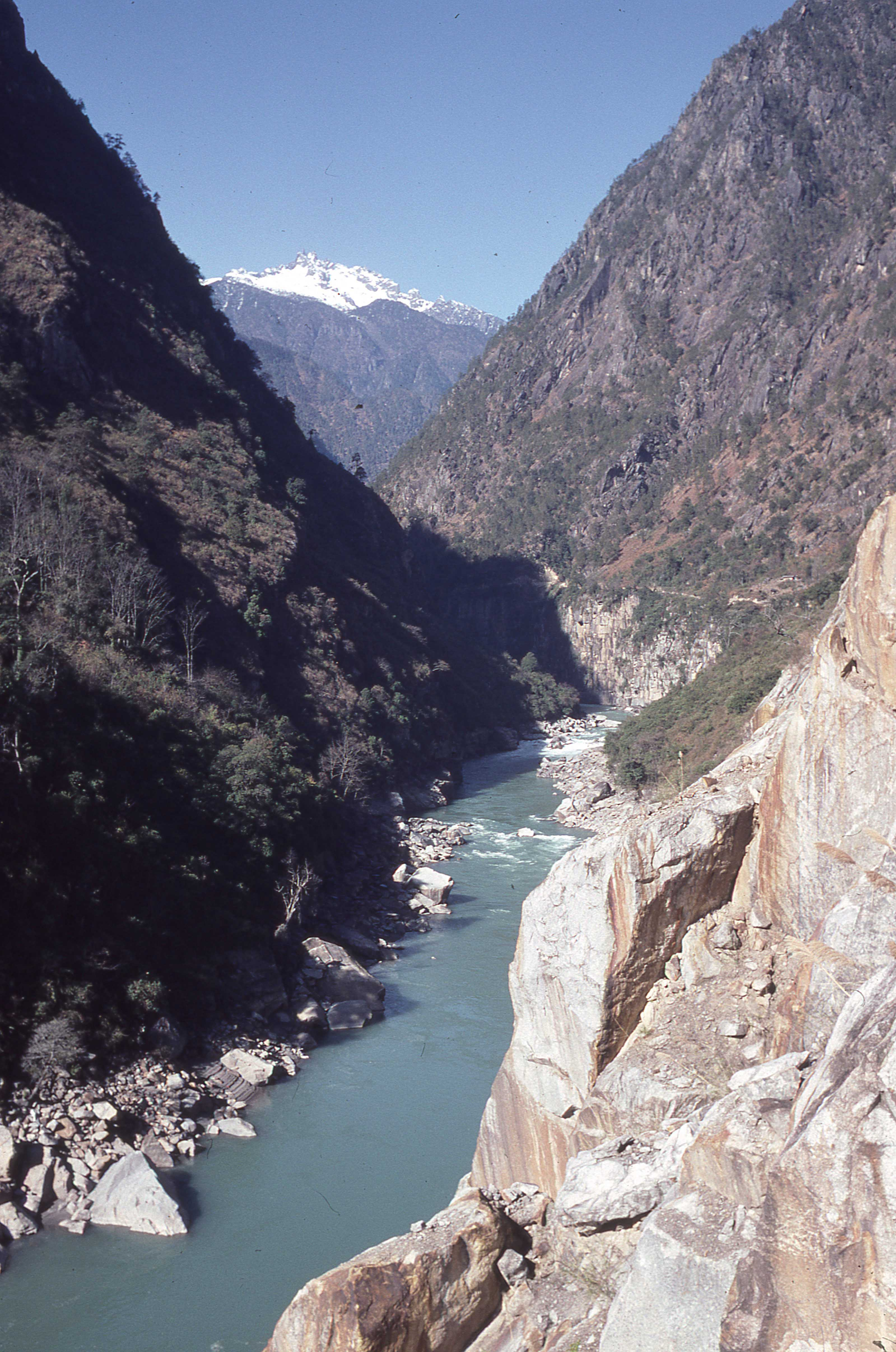
Salween River near Bingzhongluo, Yunnan

The Salween originates in the Tanggula Mountains in the central Tibetan Plateau. The headwaters are located near Dengka Peak, east of Tanggula Pass. The highest source is Jiangmeiergang Galou glacier, 5,432 m (17,822 ft) above sea level. The various headwater streams flow southwest through high mountain valleys and accumulate in Cona Lake, at 4,594 m (15,072 ft). Downstream of the lake, the Tibetan section of the river is called Gyalmo Nagqu, "black river". In Tibet the river flows mostly within Nagqu prefecture.

From Cona Lake, the river flows south and turns east near Nagqu Town, where the Chalong hydroelectric station is situated. Further east, the river is dammed at the smaller Jiquan hydroelectric station. As of 2017, these are the only two dams on the Salween River proper. Continuing east, it is joined by the Ka, Suo and Ga rivers, all flowing from the southern slope of the Tanggula Mountains. In Biru County, the river begins a series of turns south and southeast, passing through Nyingchi prefecture. Shortly before entering Yunnan, it is joined from the east by the Yu River, its longest tributary within China.

The Tibetan portion of the Salween basin is lightly populated, especially in the frigid headwater regions where precipitation is scarce and river flow depends almost entirely on glacier melt. The upper Salween basin includes more than 12,000 km^{2} (4,600 mi^{2}) of glaciers.

In Yunnan, the Salween is known as the Nujiang (Chinese: 怒江; pinyin: Nùjiāng) or Nu River, after the indigenous Nu people, but also translating literally to "angry river". (The character is only a homophone, due to Chinese having no phonetic script.) For more than 1,000 km (620 mi) the Salween runs parallel to, and west of the headwaters of the Mekong and Yangtze, separated by high mountain ridges of the Hengduan Mountains. The Gaoligong Mountains west of the Salween form the border between China and Myanmar. Between the Salween and Mekong rivers around the Tibet–Yunnan boundary are the Meili Xue Shan, which include Kawagarbo, the highest peak in the Salween basin at 6,740 m (22,110 ft).

Much of the river within Yunnan is part of the Three Parallel Rivers of Yunnan Protected Areas, a World Heritage Site. Forming canyons up to 4,500 m (14,800 ft) deep, this section is often called the "Grand Canyon of the East".

Continuing south, the river crosses the Yunnan–Guizhou Plateau via a series of deep canyons broken by wider valleys. In Longling County it is joined by the Kuke River and turns west, entering Myanmar. The total length of the river in China is 1,948 km (1,210 mi), not including a short 25 km (16 mi) segment along the China–Myanmar border. By the time it leaves China the Salween has descended more than 4,000 m (13,000 ft) from its source.

=== Lower Salween (Myanmar and Thailand) ===
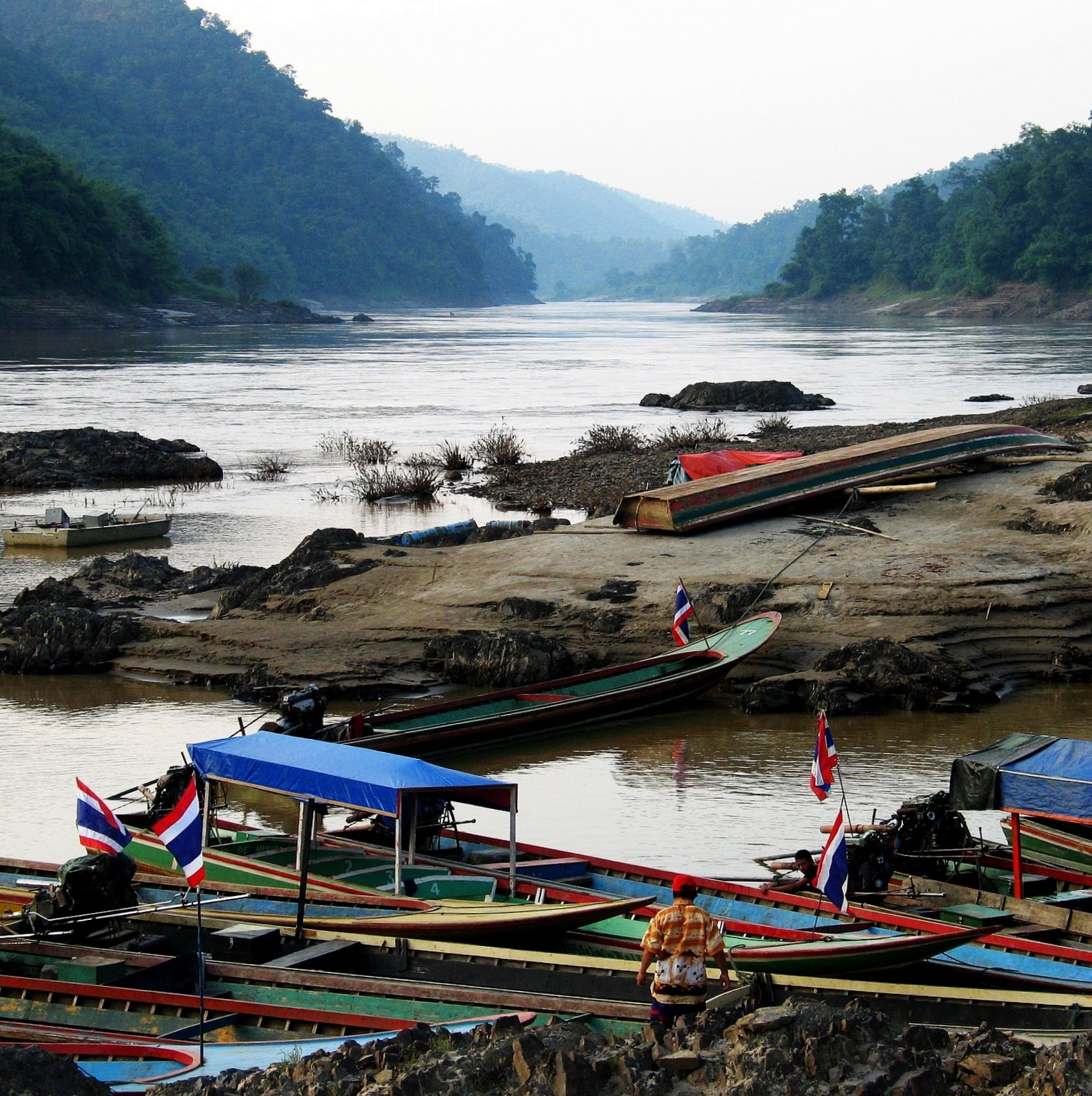
Salween River at the boundary between Myanmar and Thailand

In Myanmar the Salween river is officially known as Thanlwin; in Shan State, which the river enters immediately upon leaving China, it is also known as Nam Khone. Turning south, the river slices a winding course through the vast upland region known as the Shan Hills. This area is characterized by a complex, broken topography of small mountain ranges, plateaus and cliffs, through which the Salween has cut an extensive series of gorges. As the Salween flows south and descends in elevation, it travels from temperate to subtropical and finally tropical climate zones, with yearly precipitation ranging from 1,200 to 2,000 mm (47 to 79 in) in the Shan Hills area. The total length of the river in Myanmar and Thailand is 1,316 km (818 mi).

In Shan State and Karenni State (Kayah State) the river is joined by several large tributaries, including the Nanding River and Hka River from the east, and the Pang, Teng, and Pawn Rivers from the west. The Pang River is noted for its extensive limestone formations near the confluence with the Salween, where it breaks into a myriad of cataracts, channels and islets known as Kun Heng, "Thousand Islands". Inle Lake, the second largest lake in Myanmar and a World Biosphere Reserve, drains into the Salween by way of the Pawn River.

Further south, the river enters Karen State (Kayin State) and forms the border between Myanmar and Thailand for about 120 km (75 mi). In Thailand the river is known as Salawin; much of the Thai side of the border is part of Salawin National Park and the Salawin Wildlife Sanctuary. At the south end of the border section it is joined by the northwest-flowing Moei River, which forms the Myanmar–Thailand border south of this point. In Karen State, the river flows through karst limestone hills where numerous caves and unusual rock formations line the banks, particularly around the city of Hpa-An.

The Salween emerges from the mountains into the coastal plain near Hlaingbwe Township. Near the coast, annual rainfall is as high as 4,000 to 5,000 mm (160 to 200 in), supporting dense tropical rainforest as well as a productive rice industry. The river flows for a further 100 km (62 mi) before terminating at a modestly sized delta and estuary in Mawlamyine in Mon State. The Salween is tidally influenced up to 75 km (47 mi) inland. Here it is joined by the Gyaing River from the east and the Ataran river from the southeast. The Thanlwin Bridge, the second longest bridge in Myanmar, connects Mawlamyine to Mottama. The combined river then breaks into the Dayebauk (north) and Mawlamyine (south) channels, forming Bilugyun Island before emptying into the Gulf of Martaban.

=== List of tributaries ===
Tributaries of the Salween River
Name	Country	State/Province	Mouth coordinates	Length	Basin size
Ataran	Myanmar	Mon State	16°31′12″N 97°39′33″E	249 km (155 mi)	5,930 km^{2} (2,288 mi^{2})
Gyaing	Myanmar	Mon State	16°33′08″N 97°39′49″E	250 km (155 mi)	9,386 km^{2} (3,621 mi^{2})
Donthami	Myanmar	Mon State	16°41′27″N 97°35′18″E	148 km (92 mi)	2,143 km^{2} (827 mi^{2})
Yunzalin	Myanmar	Karen State	17°22′44″N 97°40′04″E	219 km (136 mi)	3,031 km^{2} (1,169 mi^{2})
Moei	Myanmar/Thailand	Karen State/ Mae Hong Son province	17°49′57″N 97°41′30″E	332 km (206 mi)	14,978 km^{2} (5,778 mi^{2})
Pawn	Myanmar	Karenni State	18°52′53″N 97°19′36″E	338 km (210 mi)	19,145 km^{2} (7,386 mi^{2})
Pai	Myanmar	Karenni State	19°08′45″N 97°32′38″E	205 km (127 mi)	7,178 km^{2} (2,769 mi^{2})
Teng	Myanmar	Shan State	19°51′42″N 97°44′43″E	449 km (279 mi)	15,340 km^{2} (5,918 mi^{2})
Hsim	Myanmar	Shan State	20°47′37″N 98°30′15″E	243 km (151 mi)	5,221 km^{2} (2,014 mi^{2})
Pang	Myanmar	Shan State	20°57′21″N 98°30′01″E	325 km (202 mi)	12,427 km^{2} (4,794 mi^{2})
Hka (Nanka)	Myanmar	Shan State	21°33′09″N 98°37′35″E	278 km (173 mi)	10,326 km^{2} (3,984 mi^{2})
Nanding	Myanmar	Shan State	23°24′43″N 98°40′27″E	266 km (165 mi)	8,322 km^{2} (3,211 mi^{2})
Kuke	China	Yunnan	24°19′54″N 99°10′57″E	175 km (109 mi)	6,610 km^{2} (2,550 mi^{2})
Yu	China	Tibet	28°35′49″N 98°21′54″E	453 km (281 mi)	9,389 km^{2} (3,622 mi^{2})
Leng	China	Tibet		133 km (83 mi)	3,113 km^{2} (1,201 mi^{2})
Ba	China	Tibet		111 km (69 mi)	3,792 km^{2} (1,463 mi^{2})
Ga	China	Tibet	31°09′47″N 95°15′53″E	168 km (104 mi)	4,812 km^{2} (1,856 mi^{2})
Suo	China	Tibet	31°45′37″N 93°44′57″E	264 km (164 mi)	13,939 km^{2} (5,377 mi^{2})
Ka	China	Tibet		214 km (133 mi)	8,489 km^{2} (3,275 mi^{2})

Major tributaries by average flow (1971–2000):

Name	Average discharge	Name	Average discharge
Gyaing	672.3 m^{3}/s (23,740 cu ft/s)	Kuke	111.5 m^{3}/s (3,940 cu ft/s)
Ataran	501.7 m^{3}/s (17,720 cu ft/s)	Hsim	94.2 m^{3}/s (3,330 cu ft/s)
Pawn	402.4 m^{3}/s (14,210 cu ft/s)	Pai	91.5 m^{3}/s (3,230 cu ft/s)
Moei	382.5 m^{3}/s (13,510 cu ft/s)	Ba	90.5 m^{3}/s (3,200 cu ft/s)
Teng	334.7 m^{3}/s (11,820 cu ft/s)	Yu	89.7 m^{3}/s (3,170 cu ft/s)
Pang	226.5 m^{3}/s (8,000 cu ft/s)	Suo	88.6 m^{3}/s (3,130 cu ft/s)
Donthami	213.7 m^{3}/s (7,550 cu ft/s)	Ga	84.6 m^{3}/s (2,990 cu ft/s)
Hka	202 m^{3}/s (7,100 cu ft/s)	Ka	61.8 m^{3}/s (2,180 cu ft/s)
Nanding	165.1 m^{3}/s (5,830 cu ft/s)	Leng	60.3 m^{3}/s (2,130 cu ft/s)
Yunzalin	128.6 m^{3}/s (4,540 cu ft/s)		

== Discharge ==
Flow regime at Hpa-an Station of Thanlwin River:

Year	Discharge (m^{3}/s)		
Year	Min	Mean	Max
2009	2,090	4,938	11,937
2010	1,743	4,836	11,140
2011	1,927	6,014	17,080
2012	2,145	5,312	16,227
2013	1,827	5,302	16,077
Mean	1,946	5,280	14,492

Monthly flow pattern Thanlwin river at Hpa-an during 2009 to 2013:

Month	Discharge (m^{3}/s)		
Month	Min	Mean	Max
JAN	2,007	2,833	3,580
FEB	1,803	2,643	3,483
MAR	1,743	2,506	3,451
APR	1,913	2,630	4,016
MAY	2,068	2,954	4,096
JUN	2,660	5,172	12,243
JUL	4,656	8,497	15,550
AUG	7,685	11,959	17,080
SEP	7,760	10,000	13,913
OCT	3,747	6,808	12,203
NOV	2,684	4,063	6,938
DEC	2,271	3,085	4,287

== Geology ==
The present course of the Salween began to form about 5 million years ago as the Indian subcontinent collided with Asia, resulting in the uplift of the Himalaya mountains and the Tibetan Plateau. Prior to the Himalaya orogeny, what are now the upper Irrawaddy, Salween, Mekong and Yangtze rivers may have all flowed into the Red River, emptying into the South China Sea. The landscape was hilly but not particularly rugged, with average elevations of 1,000 m (3,300 ft) or less. As the continents converged, a complex jumble of mountains arose, breaking the ancestral Red into different drainage systems, with the Yangtze heading east towards the Pacific, and the Mekong and Salween flowing south into what is now Thailand's Chao Phraya River. About 1.5 million years ago, volcanic activity diverted the Salween west towards the Andaman Sea, roughly creating the modern path of the river.

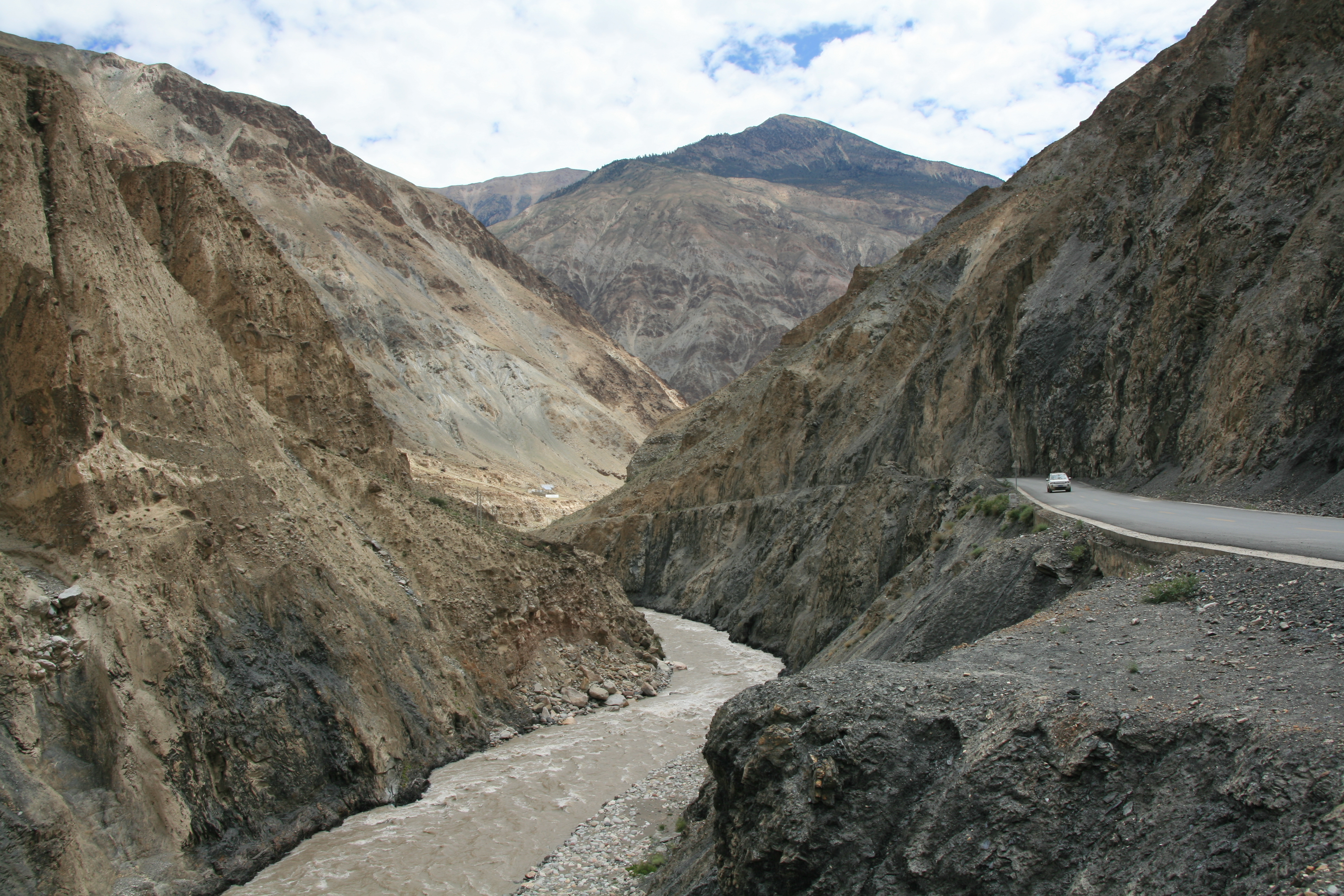
Salween (Gyalmo Nagqu) river in Tibet

The parallel modern courses of the upper Salween, Mekong and Yangtze are located where the eastern Tibetan Plateau intersects the uplands of the Yunnan–Guizhou Plateau. The mountain ranges separating these rivers are individual terranes (crustal fragments) that accreted separately to the Asian continent – forming a basin and range landscape with drainage running from north to south – then compressed together such that the rivers flow only 20 km (12 mi) apart in places. As the mountains continued to rise, the rivers incised into the landscape along parallel fault zones, creating the deep canyons of the present day. The Nujiang fault zone stretches over 600 km (370 mi) along the river in Yunnan.

The formation of the Himalayas blocked drainage from the Tibetan Plateau south towards the Indian Ocean, forcing drainage north of the mountains east towards the Yangtze river. This east-flowing river, the predecessor of the modern Yarlung Tsangpo river, was repeatedly captured into drainages to the south, finding various routes to the sea via the Red, Mekong, Salween and Irrawaddy rivers. The combined Salween–Yarlung Tsangpo drainage would have been much longer than the modern Salween, stretching an additional 1,500 km (930 mi) west across the Tibetan Plateau. Ultimately the Yarlung Tsangpo was captured by the Brahmaputra River in present-day India. The Salween may once have had additional tributaries above its present source, but due to the uplift of the Himalaya blocking moisture from the Indian Ocean, these tributaries dried up, leaving the numerous terminal lakes scattered across Nagqu today.

The Salween carries an estimated 108 to 237 million tonnes of sediment per year. About 92 percent of sediment is delivered to the ocean during the monsoon season. The Salween delta is physically contiguous with the Irrawaddy and Sittaung deltas. The Irrawaddy–Sittaung–Salween delta is relatively stable, with the coastline advancing an average of 3.4 m (11 ft) per year between 1925 and 2006. Sediment accumulation is largely balanced out by subsidence and transport by ocean currents. However, proposed dams along the Salween would trap much of the sediment with potential detrimental impacts to coastal erosion.

== Ecology ==
The Salween basin is home to thousands of species of plants, with the highest plant diversity found in Yunnan's Three Parallel Rivers region. The Three Parallel Rivers protected areas include the Gaoligongshan National Nature Reserve and the Nu Jiang Reserve within the Salween basin; the Gaoligongshan reserve has more than 4,300 plant species. The Nujiang Lancang Gorge alpine conifer and mixed forests, situated along the Nu River in western Yunnan, span elevations of 1,000 to 6,000 m (3,300 to 19,700 ft) and range from subtropical broadleaf evergreen to subalpine conifer forests. The rare Taiwania, one of the largest conifers in Asia, is found here along with more than twenty other conifer species. Due to its rugged and inaccessible terrain, this is considered one of the most intact large forest regions in China. The Mekong–Salween divide forms a significant floral and faunal barrier as well as a rain shadow, and has been regarded as a major driver of plant speciation in the region.

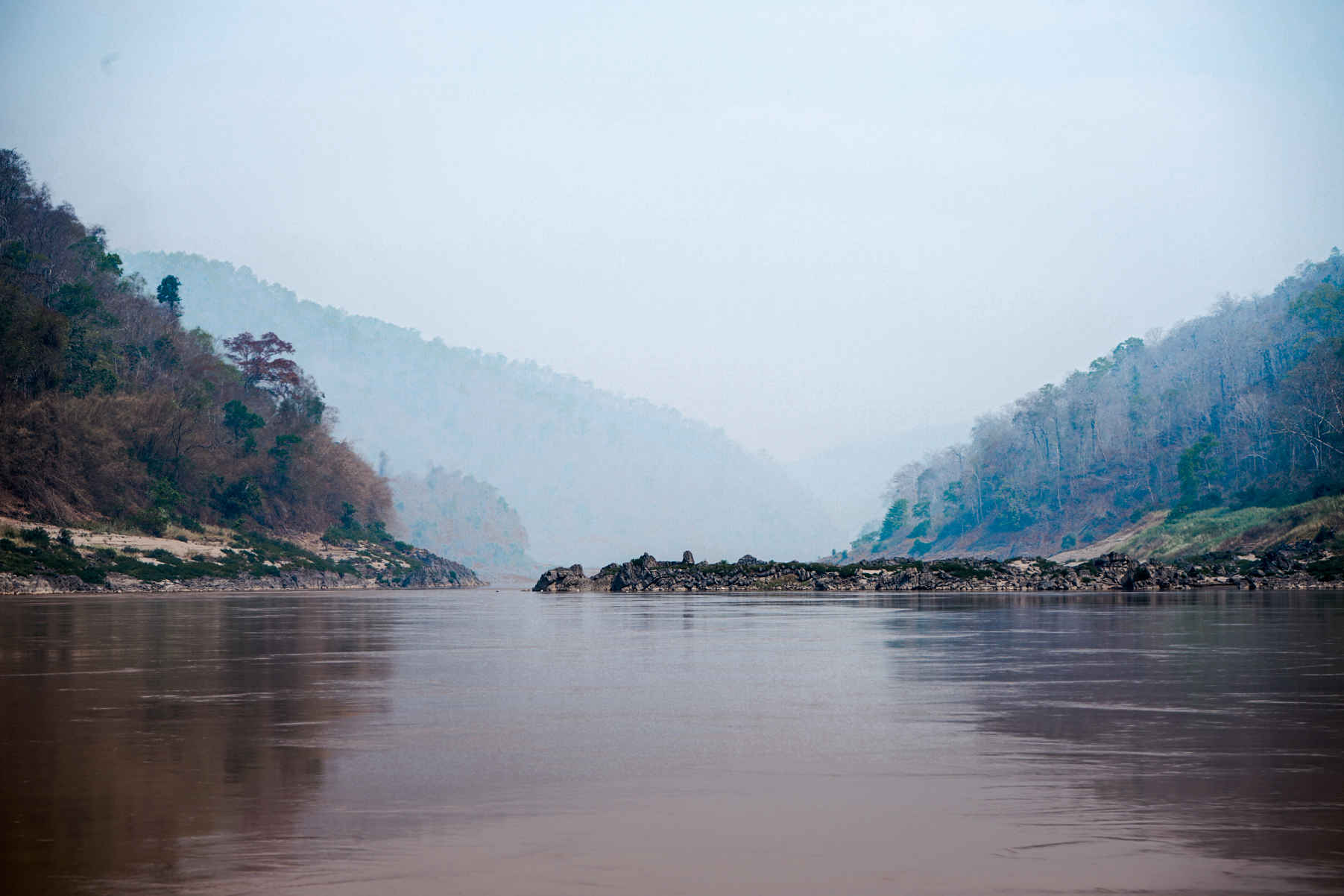
Salawin National Park in Thailand

Around the Myanmar–China border, the Salween flows through the Northern Indochina subtropical forests ecoregion, which consists largely of subtropical broad-leaved evergreen forests, with pine forests at higher elevations and tropical forests at the lower margins. Further south in Myanmar and Thailand, the Salween basin includes the Kayah–Karen montane rain forests, where the karst limestone landscape of cliffs, sinkholes and caverns lends itself to a multitude of forest types. Limestone soils host drought deciduous forests, while dipterocarp–dominant tropical forests occur on granitic soils. Montane deciduous forests are widespread in the Shan Hills. Mangrove forests occur in the Salween delta, especially on Bilugyun Island.

The basin supports about 151 fish species, with 77 of those found in the upper Salween. The Salween has numerous cyprinid species, including the endangered Garra cryptonema and Akrokolioplax bicornis which are endemic to the basin. Inle Lake in Shan State, designated a UNESCO Biosphere Reserve in 2015, provides habitat for numerous endemic fish species. The Thousand Islands area at the Salween–Pang confluence, as well as the confluence of the Salween and Moei rivers, are also identified as critical fish habitat. The Salween shares most of its fish species with the nearby Irrawaddy and Sittaung Rivers. The river also hosts a number of invasive exotic fish which were introduced for commercial purposes. In addition to fish, the Salween provides habitat for 92 amphibian species. The Salween has the greatest diversity of turtles of any river in the world. The endangered Giant Asian pond turtle and Big-headed turtle are found here.

The Salween basin includes up to 25% of the world's terrestrial animal species. About one-half of all animal species in China can be found in the upper Salween, which provides habitat for endangered species including the snow leopard and black snub-nosed monkey. The remote jungles of the Salween basin in Myanmar and Thailand, particularly in Kayin and Shan states, are home to dozens of large mammal species including the Indochinese tiger, clouded leopard, Asian black bear, sun bear, eastern hoolock gibbon, and the Sunda pangolin. Limestone caves along the Salween in Thailand are home to numerous bat species, including the endemic Kitti's hog-nosed bat, the smallest known bat species in the world. The Nam San Valley along the Shan reach of the river provides habitat for the critically endangered white-rumped vulture and the slender-billed vulture. In the Salween delta, wetlands provide habitat for fishing cat, Asian small-clawed otter and Siamese crocodile, among other species.

== Economic uses ==
=== Agriculture ===
Along its lower course the Salween sustains both flood and irrigated agriculture. The Salween delta is a major rice-growing area; it is the single most productive agricultural region in the Salween basin and home to over 500,000 people. Rice paddies are highly dependent on the river's annual flooding, bringing deposits of rich sediment. Other crops grown in the Salween basin include maize, wheat, chili, cotton, potatoes, groundnut, sesame, pulses, betel, tea, and various vegetables. Certain areas of the floodplain are suitable for both farming and fishing, such as the seasonal Daw Lar Lake upstream of Hpa-An, where crops are grown on islands in the lake during the dry season. Following the annual harvest, the land is used for grazing livestock. In the rainy season fish migrate from the Salween River to spawn in the lake, and are caught in large numbers as the water level recedes at the end of the season. The Salween generally floods in July–September and reaches its lowest around October–December. Compared to Myanmar's principal rice growing region, the Irrawaddy delta, the Salween delta floods more erratically, and is prone to drought for 1–2 years out of five.

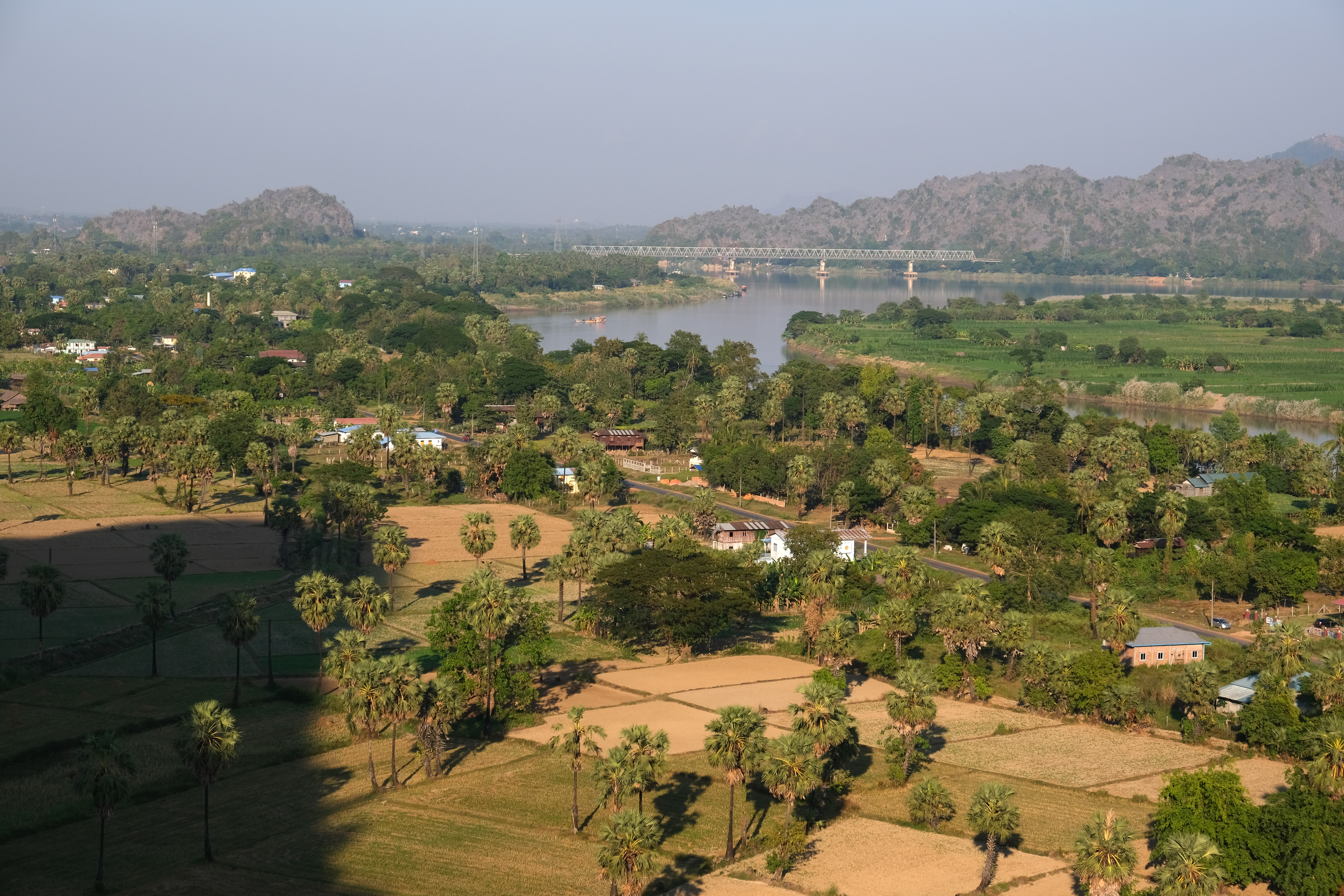
Salween River at Myaing Ka Lay, Myanmar

Approximately 380,000 ha (940,000 acres) of land is irrigated in the Salween basin, with 50 percent in Myanmar, 42 percent in China and 8 percent in Thailand. About 97 percent is irrigated with surface water, and the rest with groundwater. Total water withdrawals amount to less than 3 percent of the river flow at 5.1 km^{3} (4,100,000 acre⋅ft). In recent years rubber, sugarcane and corn have become major cash crops, with the majority of this production exported to China. From 1998 to 2010, the area cultivated for rubber in Mon State increased fivefold, accompanied by significant deforestation.

Further upstream, the river provides a water source for numerous remote villages. With arable land limited by mountainous terrain, farming occurs primarily on the seasonally flooded river banks and islands. However, forest land has been increasingly converted to agriculture, which has led to sedimentation and other water quality issues. The higher elevation valleys are used for grazing, particularly in Tibet, where yaks, sheep, goats, horses and cattle are raised. Forests along the Salween in eastern Myanmar are home to dozens of medicinal plants crucial to the production of traditional herbal medicines. Some medicinal plants are cultivated, while others are harvested wild in the forest. Many wild species are threatened by deforestation and agricultural conversion.

=== Fishing ===
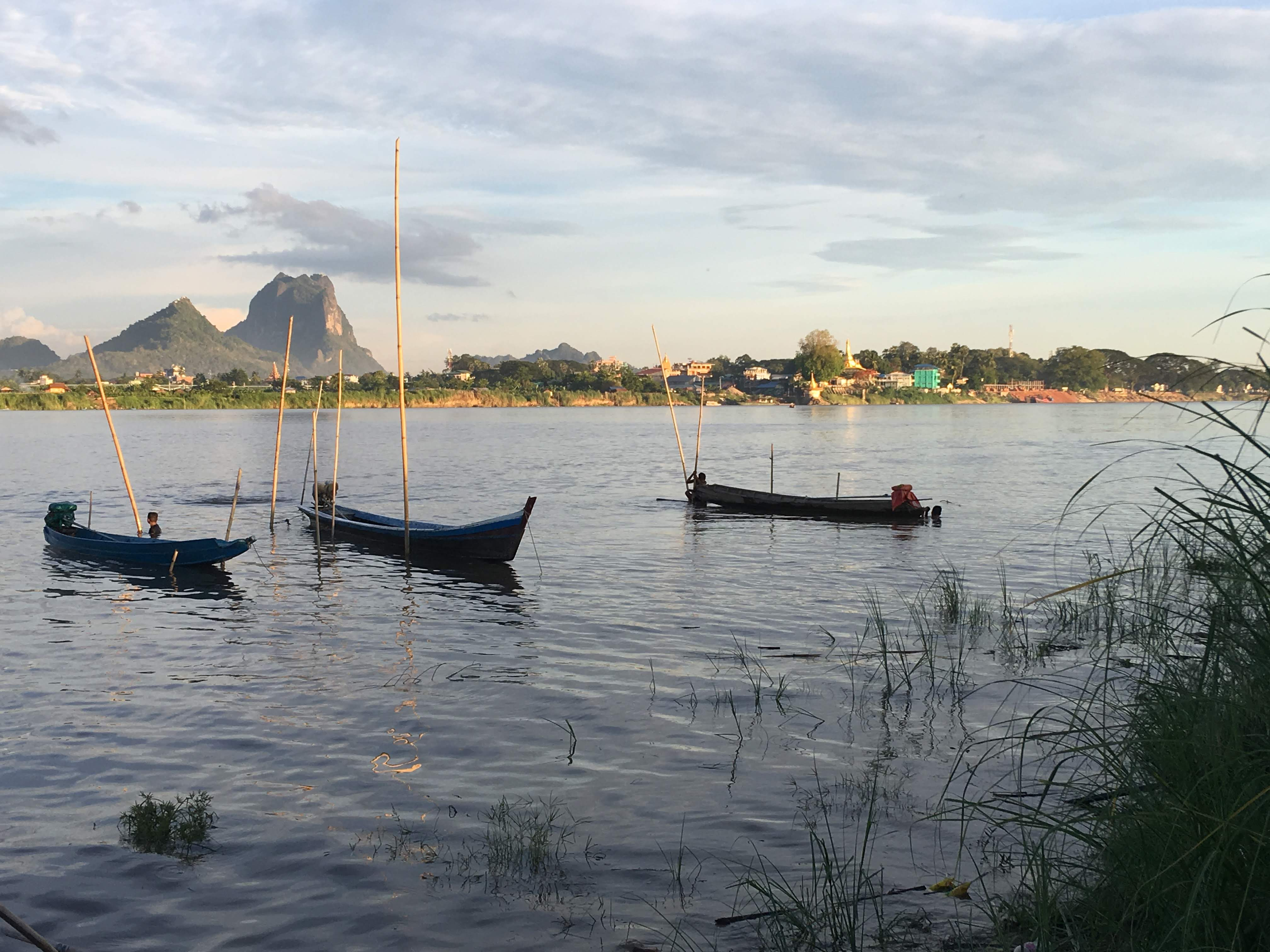
Fishing boats in the Salween River, Hpa-An

The Salween estuary and delta is a particularly rich fishery, with the complex network of tidal channels providing a diversity of habitats for freshwater, brackish and marine fishes. Subsistence fishing is predominant along the inland channels and bays, while a large commercial fishery is supported offshore. The most important commercial species include Nga pone na (Paradise threadfin) and Nga pyat (Coitor croaker). Prawns and shrimps are important in the local diet. Villages further upstream also depend on Salween fish, with Inle Lake being a particularly rich fishery.

Overfishing combined with lack of regulation has become an issue in the 21st century, with catches in the lower Salween declining as much as 60 percent at some villages. The use of large "bag nets" that result in excessive bycatch, as well as the use of illegal poisons by commercial fishermen, have also contributed to the decline. Increased sedimentation from upstream logging has made the estuary shallower and reduced its productivity, in turn reducing the rate of fish migration and spawning. The Myanmar government has made efforts to address the issues, including seasonal fishing bans first implemented in 2012, but these laws have been rarely enforced. An alternative approach, using small, self-enforced community-based reserves where fishing is not allowed, has successfully protected fish populations and species diversity in northern Thailand.

=== Logging and mining ===
Forests along the Salween are prime sources of tropical hardwoods, including teak, pyinkadoe (red ironwood) and padauk (Burmese rosewood). Logging in the Myanmar part of the basin first occurred on a large scale during the British colonial period in the 19th century. Clearcutting has destabilized soils along the river and raised sediment loads. Due to the lack of good roads across most of the basin, the majority of timber is transported via waterways during the rainy season. In China, some forests in western Yunnan were intensively logged until the 1990s, when logging was banned there due to environmental impacts.

The rate of deforestation has increased sharply in the 21st century, particularly in Shan, Karenni and Karen states. Before 2010, armed conflicts made it difficult for logging companies to access many of these areas. After a 2010 peace agreement signed between ethnic militias and the Myanmar Union Government, commercial logging was able to increase dramatically in Karenni State. The Myanmar government has banned the cutting of teak, but illegal logging for teak has persisted, driven by strong demand abroad. On the Thai side of the river, illegal logging has been ongoing since the 1990s in Salawin National Park.

In Karen State, limestone quarrying for cement production along the river has increased in the 21st century. There is also increasing sand and gravel mining in the lower river. As of 2015 the Myanmar government was seeking international investment in the mining sector, and new policies could lead to considerable increase in mining activity along the river. The river has been polluted by arsenic and other contaminants from these mines.

== History ==
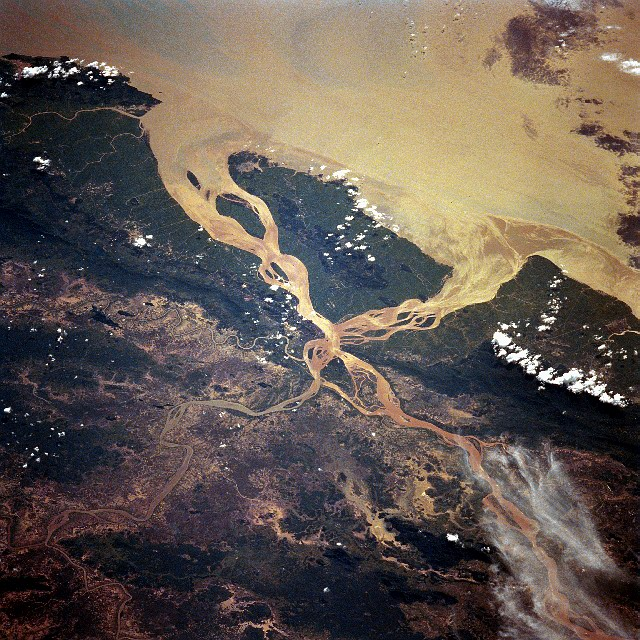
Aerial view of the Salween Delta (North is to the right). This area has been home to Mon people for at least 5,000 years.

Human presence along the upper Salween River dates to at least 31,000–39,000 years ago. Archeological evidence includes stone tools and animal remains discovered along the river bank in the southeastern Tibetan Plateau.

The Mon are some of the earliest inhabitants of the Salween basin within Myanmar, migrating south from China around 3000 BCE, and settling in the Salween delta and adjacent coastal areas. Agriculture was first practiced in the Salween and Irrawaddy basins around the first century BCE. Ancestors of the Karen migrated down the Salween River area from the Tibetan Plateau and northwest China starting around 1000 BCE. Tai peoples, ancestors of the Shan, began moving into the Shan Hills area of the middle Salween from Yunnan around 1000 CE and established multiple independent kingdoms, often known as the Shan States.

The Nu people, originating in the Tibetan Plateau, may have inhabited the areas of the Salween (Nu) and Mekong (Lancang) in modern day China as early as 2000 BCE. The Wa people, who today inhabit parts of the Salween basin on both sides of the China–Burma border, migrated south along the river from Tibet around 500–300 BCE. The Lisu people, also originating in Tibet, arrived in Yunnan sometime before 1000 CE. Chinese records begin to mention Lisu in the late Tang dynasty (618–907 CE). The Lisu originally inhabited areas further east in Yunnan, but over centuries they were pushed north and west towards the Salween as more Han people settled in Yunnan.

=== Expansion of empires ===
Martaban (now Mottama) in the Salween Delta was a major trading port on the Maritime Silk Road as early as 200 BCE. By the 6th century CE, the Thaton kingdom (one of the early Mon kingdoms) ruled the Salween Delta and surrounding coasts from the capital of Thaton. From 738–902 CE, the kingdom of Nanzhao controlled Yunnan and parts of northern Burma, with the Salween forming its southwestern boundary with the Burmese Pyu city-states. Tang China had several overland trade routes with Burma via Nanzhao, which it was allied with at times. One route started from Yinsheng (around present-day Jingdong, Yunnan) and headed west, then south along the Salween River, reaching the Indian Ocean at Martaban. Another crossed the Salween around present day Baoshan, heading west towards India.

In the 1060s, King Anawrahta expanded the boundaries of the Pagan kingdom (First Burmese Empire) from its origins in the Irrawaddy valley, conquering Thaton and the other Mon kingdoms in the Salween delta. In the late 1100s, King Narapatisithu (Sithu II) conquered most of the Shan States, extending Burmese rule to the western bank of the Salween river from the delta as far north as Yunnan. For almost 500 years, the lower Salween defined the frontier between Burma and the Ayutthaya Kingdom (Siam).

In the late 1200s, the Pagan kingdom collapsed after invasions of the Mongol Empire. The Mongols had also conquered the Dali kingdom (Nanzhao's successor). In 1287 the Hanthawaddy kingdom emerged in the Salween and Irrawaddy deltas. Martaban served as the Hanthawaddy capital between 1287 and 1364. Along the mountainous middle reaches of the Salween River, former Shan vassal states regained their independence. Starting around 1380, Ming China annexed Yunnan and conquered some of the eastern Shan states. From 1436-49, Chinese armies crossed the Salween to wage the Luchuan–Pingmian campaigns against the Shan state of Möng Mao. These wars were an expensive failure for the Ming, and triggered tribal uprisings that fragmented Chinese power in the region.

The Toungoo dynasty emerged in Burma during the 1500s, conquering much of Southeast Asia by 1565 to create the First Toungoo Empire (Second Burmese Empire). King Tabinshwehti captured and destroyed Martaban in 1541. Under the subsequent rule of Bayinnaung, an 800,000-strong army crossed the Salween in 1548 and invaded Siam. This was the first time Burmese rule had been extended east of the Salween River. Subsequently, Bayinnaung moved north up the Salween, subjugating all the independent Shan states by 1557. These victories were enabled in part by the acquisition of firearms from Dutch and Portuguese traders who first reached these coasts around 1511. European mercenaries also fought in some of these battles. At Martaban, the Portuguese established a trading post, one of the first European settlements in the area.

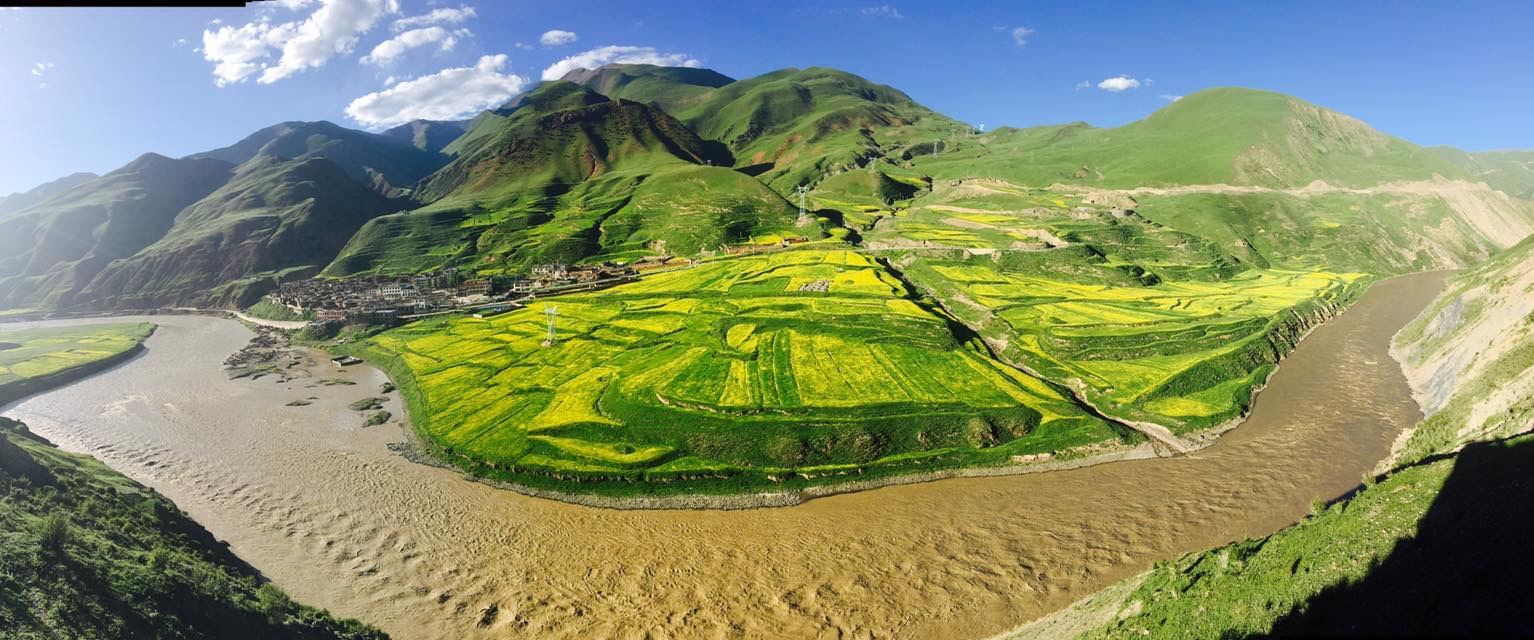
Salween (Nagqu) in Biru County, Tibet

In the 1640s, the last years of the Ming dynasty, geographer Xu Xiake explored the Salween River country and determined that the upper Salween, Mekong and Red rivers (previously believed to be part of the same river system) were in fact separate. After the rise of the Qing dynasty China entered a new period of western expansion. In 1717, the Dzungar Khanate conquered Tibet, and China sought to expel them from the region. In 1718, the Qing sent an army but were unsuccessful in reaching Tibet, reaching only as far as the Salween River where they were defeated by Dzungar troops in the Battle of the Salween River. In response, the Qing sent a larger force to Tibet in 1720, driving out the Dzungars and establishing Qing rule of Tibet.

As the Qing pushed into Yunnan, the indigenous Lisu people were driven further west, eventually settling along the Salween in and around Nujiang Prefecture. Although China had been expanding into the area since Ming times, the greatest influx of settlers was around 1700 to 1850. At the same time, Tibet was expanding its influence into western Yunnan. Tibetan parties raided down the Salween valley and took slaves from the indigenous Nu and Derung populations, which were not well politically organized and unable to offer much resistance. On the other hand, the Lisu fiercely resisted efforts to take slaves and land.

In the 1590s Siam had captured the Tenasserim coast, and the Salween delta again became the border with Burma. For more than a hundred years this remained a disputed area, changing hands several times between the Burmese and Siamese. Burmese rule returned to the Salween delta in the 1750s with the expansion of the Konbaung dynasty. Starting in 1759, Martaban served as a launching point for several invasions of Siam, which led to the collapse of the Ayutthaya kingdom. The Burmese were unable to maintain lasting control over territories east of the river, although Burma regained the Tenasserim coast from Siam in a 1793 treaty.

=== British rule and World War II ===
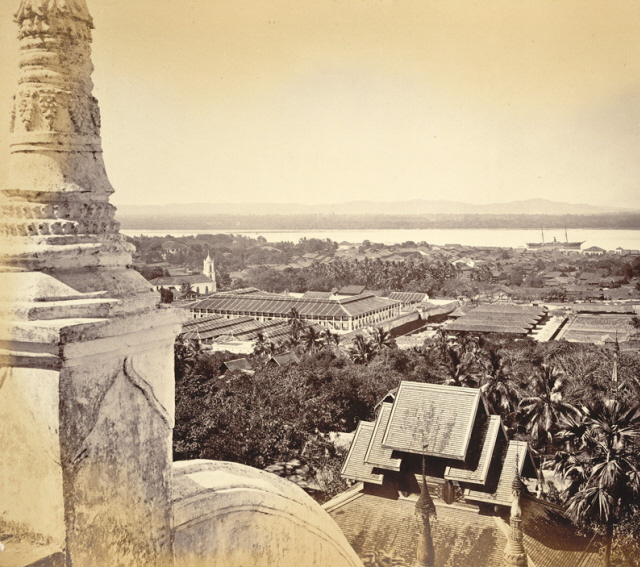
Moulmein during British rule, around 1870. View of the Salween River in the distance.

After the First Anglo-Burmese War in 1824, the Konbaung dynasty ceded coastal areas of Burma to the British Empire, including the whole Tenasserim coast south of the Salween River. Due to its strategic location, Mawlamyine (anglicized as Moulmein) served as the capital of British Burma from 1826 until 1852 and as a gateway for overland trade into Yunnan. It became the center of a lucrative timber industry, particularly in teak. Logs were floated down the Salween River to meet oceangoing ships in Mawlamyine port. Forests in the lower Salween basin were extensively logged until the 1890s. Contemporary British maps labeled the river as "Salween", an anglicization of the Burmese name Thanlwin.

At the start of the 20th century, there was still great uncertainty regarding the true sources of the river and how far west it extended into the Himalayas; some believed the upper Brahmaputra River (the Yarlung Tsangpo) might be the true source of the Irrawaddy, Salween or Mekong. In 1935-36, British geographer Ronald Kaulback walked the length of the Salween River from Burma to eastern Tibet, producing some of the first comprehensive maps of the river's course. Kaulback allegedly found giant footprints in the snow while attempting to locate the source of the Salween. His report was one of several that popularized the myth of the Yeti in Europe during the 1930s.

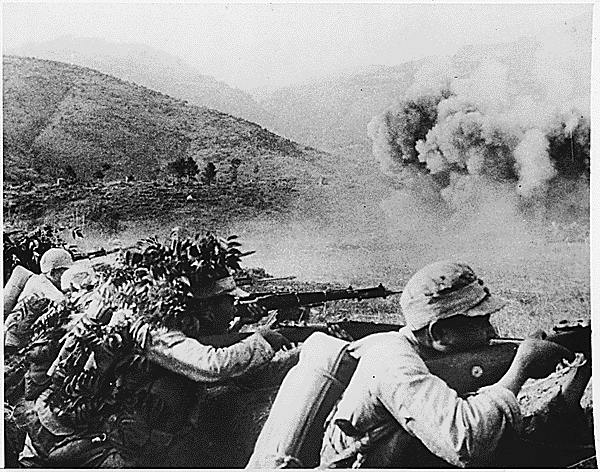
Chinese troops battle the Japanese along the Salween River in Burma, 1944

During World War II the Japanese Empire invaded Burma, starting at Mawlamyine in January 1942. The Japanese army, numbering 18,000 against 7,000 British defenders, quickly captured Mawlamyine, forcing the British to retreat across the Salween to Martaban. On February 10–11 the Japanese crossed the Salween and the British fled, unprepared for a siege. The Japanese blockaded the Burma Road constructed in 1938 during the Second Sino-Japanese War, forcing the British to transport military supplies to China by air across the eastern Himalayas ("The Hump"). The retreating Allied army (primarily Chinese) stopped the Japanese advance at the Salween River on May 5, 1942 (Defence of the Salween river). After blowing all the bridges crossing the river, the Chinese took defensive positions on the east bank along a 100-mile (160 km) front, at which point the fighting reached a stalemate.

From 1944–1945, Allied forces launched the Salween Campaign to retake Burma and reopen the Burma Road. During the initial offensive on May 11, 1944, about 40,000 troops of the Chinese Expeditionary Force (CEF), led by American General Joseph Stilwell and assisted by US army air forces, crossed the Salween on rubber rafts and attacked the Japanese position west of the river. About 17,000–19,000 Chinese and 15,000 Japanese were killed in the resulting battle, from which the Chinese emerged victorious. In the following days, additional CEF troops crossed the river bringing the total to 100,000, before pushing west into Japanese-held territory. The Salween Campaign concluded on January 20, 1945 with the fall of Wanding. By August 1945 the Allies had retaken Burma from the Japanese.

=== 1948–present ===
In 1948, Burma declared independence from the British Empire. Soon afterwards, ethnic minorities in the Salween River region, including the Kachin, Karen, Mon, and Shan, sought independence, with armed conflicts between these groups and the Burmese military continuing to the present day. The Karen National Union and Mon National Defense Organization took control of the lower Salween River valley, including Mawlamyine and Thaton, in September 1948. However, they were soon pushed out, leading to four years of confused fighting. In 1952, a new Karen state (today's Kayin State) was created, with the capital at Hpa-an on the Salween 50 kilometres (31 mi) north of Mawlamyine, but the insurgency continued.

In 1950 Chinese Nationalist troops invaded Shan State after being defeated by the Communists in the Chinese Civil War, with the aim of creating an independent state from which to retake mainland China. With the help of US forces, the Chinese attempted several times to take land on the west side of the Salween River, but were pushed back by the Burmese army. Although the KMT campaign was unsuccessful, many people of Chinese descent continue to live in the area east of the river. These events contributed to political instability in Shan State. By 1958 several insurgencies had become established in eastern Shan State, including one led by the exiled Communist Party of Burma (CPB, or "White Flag Communists"). This area, part of the Golden Triangle, became a center for illegal opium production during the 1960s. Opium trafficking remains a major source of funding for insurgents.

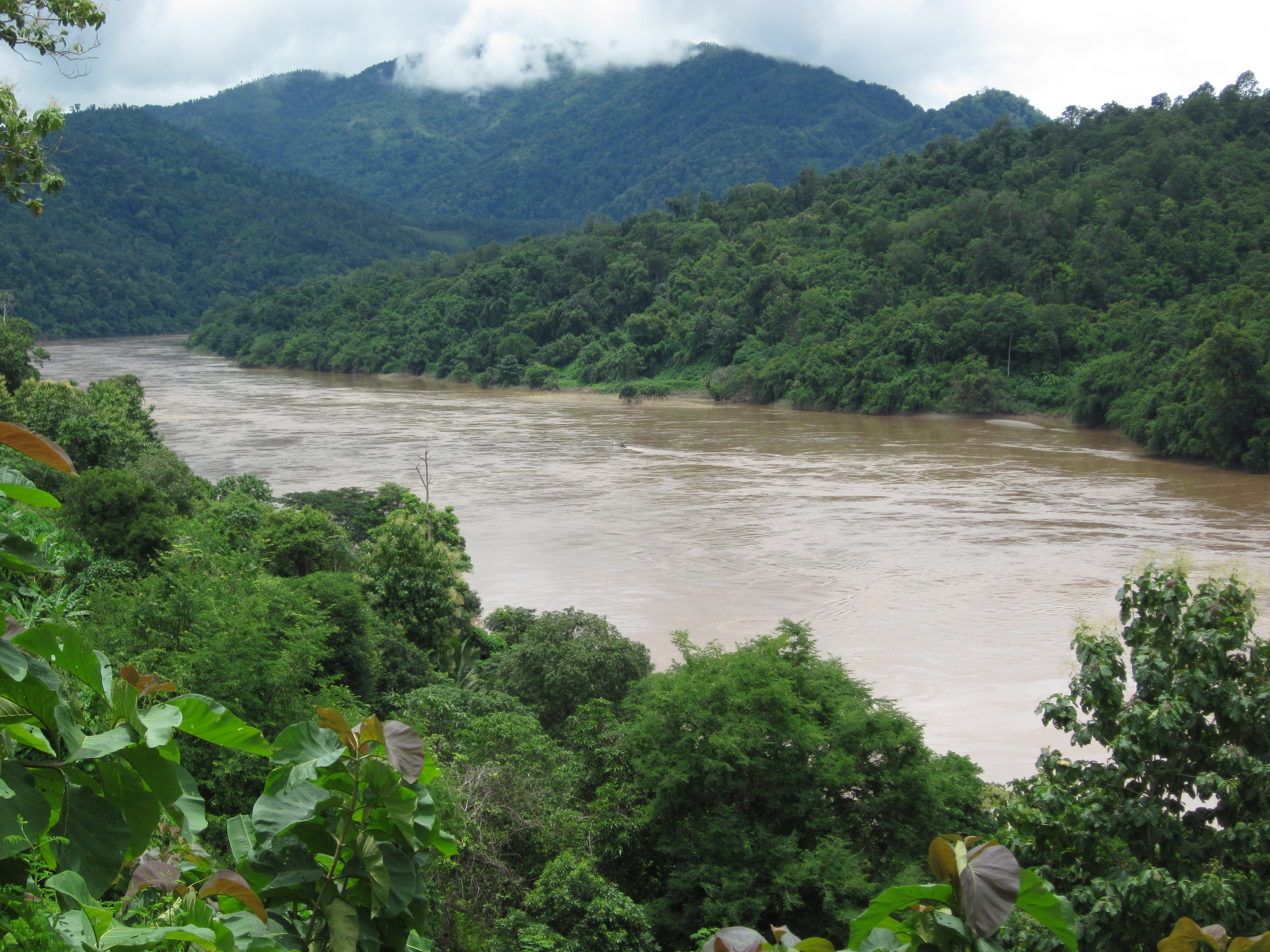
Salween on the border of Burma and Thailand

In the 1970s the Burmese and Thai governments began planning for hydroelectric dams on the Salween River, largely within Shan and Karen-majority areas. Starting in 1979 the Electricity Generating Authority of Thailand conducted feasibility studies for hydropower and irrigation diversions on the river. Salween development plans gained momentum in 1988, when the SPDC seized power in Burma and sought cross-border economic development with Thailand and China. That same year, Thai Prime Minister Chatichai Choonhavan presented an economic vision for the Salween border region – from a "battlefield into a marketplace".

In addition to the revenues from electricity production, the SPDC saw dam construction as "part of a strategy to remove ethnic armed groups" from the area. In the years following, the military junta stepped up its attacks in the region, destroying villages and forcing over 500,000 Shan, Kachin and Karen refugees to flee the country, mostly to Thailand. The Salween creates a formidable barrier for refugees, due to its wide fast current, and only small wooden boats are available for crossing it. About 150,000 refugees are housed in official camps in Thailand, while hundreds of thousands of more live in illegal camps.

Thailand's Salawin National Park was established in 1994. Before that, thousands of refugees had already settled in this area and the adjacent Salawin Wildlife Sanctuary, with more moving in during the years following. The Thai government has made some efforts to remove them, but due to the vast size of the park, enforcement has been difficult. In 1997 a scandal was uncovered in which logs cut on the Thai side of the river were floated across the river to Myanmar, stamped "exported from Burma" and floated back to the Thai side, where officials inspected the "imported" timber and approved their sale. Refugees in camps within the parks were implicated in the scandal and forced to relocate. However, "observers of forced evictions have stated that the eviction of Thai-Karen villagers from forest reserves is not done to protect the forests but so that [illegal] logging activities can continue without hindrance and with fewer witnesses."

After the end of military rule in 2011 the Burmese government signed ceasefire agreements with 14 ethnic militias. However, protests followed by armed conflict soon broke out again around the sites of proposed dams, particularly at the Mong Ton (Tasang Dam) in Shan State and the Hatgyi Dam in Karen State. Residents along the Salween River contend the dams would bring no economic benefits locally – as most of the electricity would be exported abroad – while their homes and traditional lands would be flooded with little to no compensation.

Ethnic minority leaders and human rights activists say a pattern they call "damming at gunpoint" has been repeated across eastern Myanmar: proposed dam sites are forcefully depopulated by the military without compensation and the region is militarized through the expansion of army camps, helicopter pads, access roads and other facilities.

Local organizations, including the Karen Environmental and Social Action Network (KESAN), have pushed for the establishment of a "Salween Peace Park" that would manage the river's natural resources sustainably via community forests, wildlife sanctuaries, fishery conservation and protected indigenous lands. The park would cover more than 5,000 square kilometres (1,900 mi^{2}) along the Salween River and its tributaries in Myanmar. The proposal was inaugurated in December 2018.

== Dams ==
=== Myanmar and Thailand ===
Seven dams have been proposed along the main stem of the Salween in Myanmar and Thailand, with a combined capacity exceeding 20,000 megawatts of electricity – comparable to that of China's Three Gorges Dam. The reservoirs would flood 691 kilometres (429 mi) of the 1,200 kilometres (750 mi) total river length in Myanmar, as well as the downstream ends of several tributaries. Electricity generated by these dams would be exported primarily to China and Thailand. In May 2005, a formal Memorandum of Understanding was signed between Myanmar and Thailand to jointly develop hydropower projects along the Salween River. Since then, a number of Chinese and Thai companies have partnered to develop these projects. In 2015, the newly elected National League for Democracy (NLD) government was expected to downsize or cancel the dam projects. However, the NLD soon announced the projects would go ahead.

The Mong Ton or Tasang Dam is the largest of the planned dams. The dam would be 228 metres (748 ft) high, and produce up to 7,110 megawatts. The reservoir would flood 870 km^{2} (210,000 acres), splitting Shan State nearly in two. The Hatgyi Dam in downstream Kayin State would be smaller, but would have a more significant impact on the river flow. In addition to producing power, the Hatgyi dam would divert some of the Salween flow during certain seasons into the Ping River, part of Thailand's Chao Phraya basin, to benefit agriculture in central Thailand. A smaller alternative to the Salween diversion would be a diversion of the Yuam River (a tributary of the Salween via the Moei River) to the Ping.

The Kunlon Dam (Burmese: ကွန်းလုံဆည်) is planned to be built in northern Shan State, Myanmar. Salween River is the last undammed major river in South East Asia. The project was initiated by the Chinese firm Yunnan Machinery & Equipment Import & Export Co. (YMEC) and is co-financed by the Chinese state through Hydrochina Corporation. One of the conditions for the dam, whose effect is expected to be in the 1200-1400 MW range, is to transfer at least 50% of the electricity production to China.

There are numerous concerns surrounding the potential impact of the dams, particularly the effect on agriculture in the Salween delta due to a reduction in the annual floods and sediment supply that maintain soil fertility. Water would be released based on power demand rather than agricultural needs, potentially causing water shortages and saline intrusion in the delta. In addition, there would be numerous ecological impacts, as the dams would block fish migration, and necessitate considerable deforestation to clear the areas to be flooded. The dams would also be located in an area with high earthquake risk.

In 2016, the Myanmar government announced its intention to complete the remaining dams by 2031. Construction plans have raised many concerns regarding social impact, human rights abuses and displacement.

Proposed dams on the Salween in Myanmar
Name	Location	Height	Flooding area	Generating capacity	Annual production	Status
Hatgyi Dam	Hlaingbwe Township, Karen State	33 m (108 ft)		1,365 MW	7,325 GWh	Pre-construction
Dagwin Dam	Karen State/Mae Hong Son province	56 m (184 ft)		792 MW		Suspended
Weigyi Dam	Karen State and Karenni State/Mae Hong Son province	168 m (551 ft)	640 km^{2} (247 mi^{2})	4,540 MW		Suspended
Ywathit Dam	Karenni State			4,500 MW	21,789 GWh	Planned
Mong Ton Dam (Tasang Dam)	Mong Ton Township, Shan State	228 m (748 ft)	870 km^{2} (335 mi^{2})	7,110 MW	35,446 GWh	Pre-construction
Noung Pha Dam	Tangyan Township, Shan State	90 m (295 ft)		1,200 MW		Planned
Kunlong Dam	Kunlong Township, Shan State			1,400 MW		Planned

=== China ===
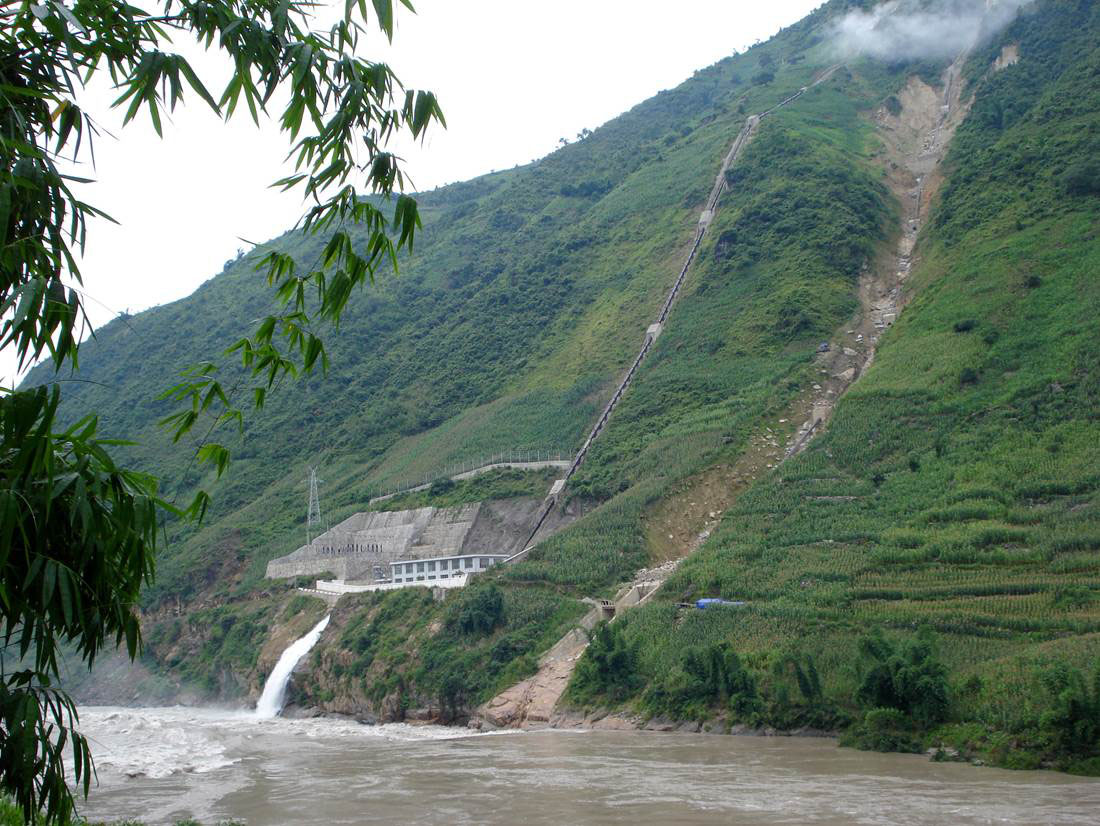
Small hydroelectric plant next to the Salween River in Yunnan

In 2000, China initiated the West-East Power Transfer development scheme, to develop large-scale hydropower dams on its western rivers. The Salween (Nu) River basin within China has an estimated 36,400 megawatts of hydropower potential. The power would be exported to southeastern China, particularly the Guangzhou megalopolis. This included thirteen dams on the mainstem of the Nu, with a total capacity of 21,320 megawatts, and a number of small to medium-size projects on tributaries. The tallest mainstem dam, Songta, would be 307 metres (1,007 ft) high. In 2003 the Yunnan Huadian Nu River Hydropower Company was created after an agreement between the Yunnan provincial government and the Huadian Group.

The proposal to develop the Nu River, one of China's last free-flowing rivers, was met with large protests from local residents as well as from international environmental organizations. If constructed, the dams would have displaced some 56,000 people. In addition, in 2003 the UNESCO World Heritage Committee had voted to list Yunnan's Three Parallel Rivers region as a World Heritage Site. Many of the proposed dams fell within this area. In 2004 Premier Wen Jiabao temporarily suspended plans to build dams on the main stem of the river, although a number of hydropower projects on tributaries were ultimately built. In addition, the Chalong and Jiquan hydroelectric projects were built on the uppermost section of the Salween in Tibet. After Wen's term of office ended in 2013, power companies made a renewed push for construction of the Nu River dams.

The Yunnan provincial government first proposed a Nu River Grand Canyon National Park in 2007, but did not begin development of this proposal until 2014. In January 2016, Yunnan suspended small hydropower development as well as mining along the Nu River and in May approved the establishment of the national park. In December 2016, China's State Energy Administration formally dropped the Nu River dams from its hydropower development plans. A major factor in the cancellation of the dams was the risk of earthquakes along the Nu River fault zone.

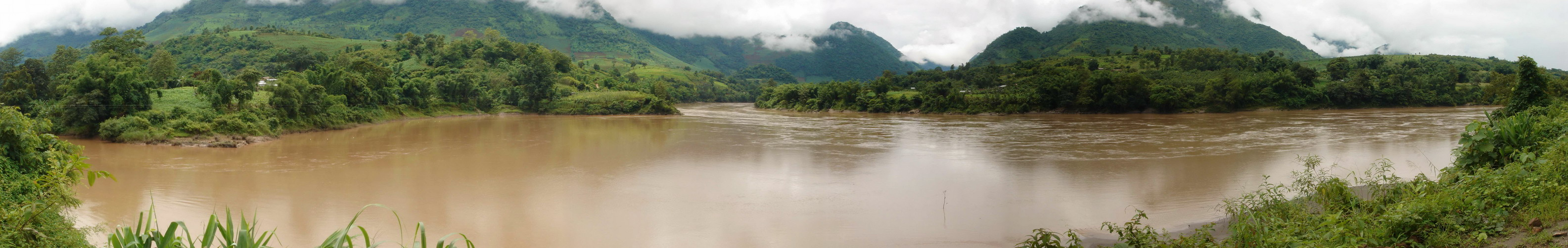
View of Salween River in Shan State

== See also ==
- List of rivers of Asia
- List of rivers of China
- List of rivers of Myanmar
- List of rivers of Thailand
- List of rivers by length
- List of rivers by discharge
- Defence of the Salween River
- Pai River
- Jinsha River
- Wang Yongchen
- Bogyoke Aung San bridge
