= Langhko Township =

Langhko Township လင်းခေးမြို့နယ် ၸႄႈဝဵင်းလၢင်းၶိူဝ်း
- Township
- Linkhae Township
- Location in Langkho district
- Coordinates: 20°N 98°E
- Country: Myanmar
- State: Shan State
- District: Langkho District
- Capital: Langkho
- Capital: Langhko

Area
  - Total: 1,568.42 sq mi (4,062.2 km^{2})
- Elevation: 2,029 ft (618 m)

Population (2023)
  - Total: 50,791
  - Density: 32.384/sq mi (12.503/km^{2})
- Time zone: UTC+6.30 (MMT)

Langhko Township or Langkho Township (Shan: ၸႄႈဝဵင်းလၢင်းၶိူဝ်း), officially Lin Khae Township (Burmese: လင်းခေးမြို့နယ်) is a township of Langhko District in the Shan State of Burma. The township has two towns- the principal town of Langkho with 8 urban wards and the town of Homein with 4 urban wards. It also has 94 villages grouped into 14 village tracts. The township has one subtownship Homein Subtownship.

== Geography ==
Most of the area is characterized by the forest-covered mountains of the Shan Hills which reach a height of 2,129 m (6,985 ft) at Loi Lan, a mountain rising at the southern end of the administrative area.

The capital town is Langkho (Langhkö), located in the northern part. The township borders with Mae Hong Son Province of Thailand in the south.
