= Langhko District =

District in Shan State, Myanmar

Linkhae District လင်းခေးခရိုင် ၸႄႈတွၼ်ႈလၢင်းၶိူဝ်း
- Langhko District (Red) in Shan State
- Coordinates: 20.083°N 98.418°E
- Country: Myanmar
- Region: Shan State
- Capital: Langhko
- Time zone: MMT

Langhko District or Langkho District (Shan: ၸႄႈတွၼ်ႈလၢင်းၶိူဝ်း), officially Linkhae District (Burmese: လင်းခေးခရိုင်), is a district in southern Shan State in Myanmar.

== Townships ==
townships in Langkho district Langkho Mawkmai Mongpan

The district contains the following townships and subtownships:

- Langhko Township
  - Homein Subtownship
- Mawkmai Township
- Mong Pan Township

Prior to 2022, it also contained the Mong Nai Township. Mong Nai Township was split off to form part of the new Nansang District along with other townships from neighbouring former Loilen District. It also additionally contained Mong Hta and Mong Hta Subtownship, which was transferred to Mong Ton Township to form the new Mong Ton District.
