= Mong Ton =

Mong Ton ဝဵင်းမိူင်းတူၼ် မိုင်းတုံမြို့
- Town
- Location within Myanmar
- Coordinates: 20°18′N 98°56′E
- Country: Myanmar
- State: Shan State
- District: Mong Ton District
- Township: Mong Ton Township
- Elevation: 1,612 ft (491 m)

Population
  - Estimate: 90,000
- Time zone: UTC+6:30 (MMT)

Mong Ton (Burmese: မိုင်းတုံမြို့, MLCTS: muing.tu.mrui) also known historically as Möngtung and Maington, is the capital of Mong Ton District and seat of Mong Ton Township southern Shan State in eastern Myanmar near the border with Thailand. Mong is equivalent to Township or land. "Ton"is equivalent to [Royal City]. It is located in the Daen Lao Range, in the eastern part of the Shan State, east of the Salween River. Mong Ton lies on the National Highway 22 and connected to NarrkgMuu and Ponparkyin, is also connected to Mong Hsat by National Highway 49 which begins to the north-east of the town.

== History ==
Mong Ton has had a turbulent and unstable history. According to Shan tradition King Naresuan was cremated and his ashes interred in a stupa in Mong Ton. in 1888, when the area was part of British Burma, Möngtung, Möng Hang, Möng Hat and Möng Kyawt, were claimed by Siam and were occupied secretly by Siamese troops. A fifth district, Möng Hsat, was also claimed by Siam, but no garrisons were posted there. The districts were annexed by Thailand in 1942, following the Japanese invasion of Burma and were added to the Saharat Thai Doem territory. They were returned to British Burma at the end of World War II.

More recently there have been conflicts between the Shan State Army – South (SSA-S) and the Myanmar Armed Forces, although the problem is worse in the Kyethi, Mongkung, and Laihka Townships. In Mong Ton and Mong Hsat Township, the SPDC has demanded the removal of some UWSA military outposts and the Burmese Army is exerting more pressure on Lahu militias to conscript more soldiers and prepare to fight both the SSA–S and the UWSA. The SPDC supported three basic military training courses for the Lahu militia in Mong Ton during 2009.

Given its location near the border with Thailand and internal conflict, the Myanmar Armed Forces have the important IB277 military base just outside the town. There are five Burmese army battalions in Mong Ton town alone. Trafficking of narcotics is a major problem in Mong Ton and Burma is the number two opium producer in the world after Afghanistan, and one of the leading producers of amphetamines in South East Asia. The Free Burma Rangers have alleged that the army is involved in the production and trafficking of narcotics in order to profit from the trade in opium, heroin and amphetamines. Opium is cultivated and it is not only processed for trade abroad it is also consumed by some local villagers and has created drug addiction problems.

In April 2022, it was split from Mong Hsat District to form its own district - Mong Ton District.
