= Wan Hsa-la =

- Village
- Location within Myanmar
- Coordinates: 20°27′3″N 98°39′20″E
- Country: Myanmar
- State: Shan State
- District: Mong Hsat District
- Township: Mong Ton Township
- Time zone: UTC+6:30 (MMT)

Wan Hsa-la is a village in Mong Ton Township in Mong Hsat District, Shan State. It lies near the Salween River and is surrounded by forests, connected by road across the hills to Mong Ton and Thailand in the east. The village was the site of a battle in 1948 between the Burmese army together with the Chinese Communist troops dressed in Burmese army uniforms against the KMT, commanded by General Li.
