= Federated Shan States =

Division of the British Empire in Burma (1922–1959)

Federated Shan States (1922–1948) Shan State (1948–1959)
- Subject of British Raj (1922–1937); Subject of Colony of Burma (1937–1948); State of Union of Burma (1948–1959)
- 1922–1959
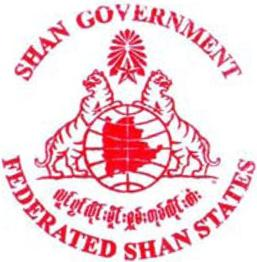
- Flag Coat of arms

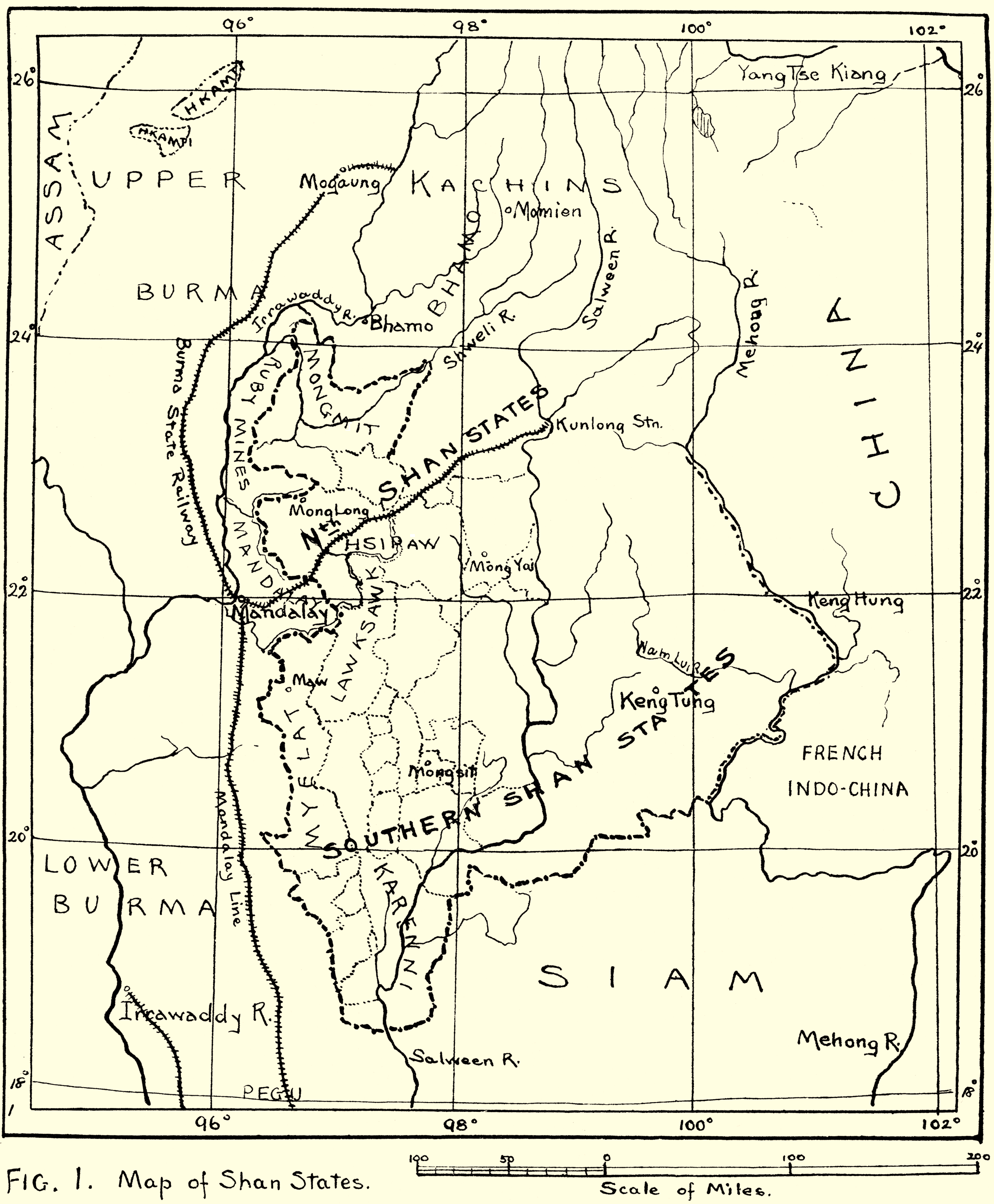
- 1917 map of the Shan and Karenni States already within one border
  - Type: Absolute monarchy (before 1948); Absolute monarchy under parliamentary republic (after 1948)
- History
  - Establishment: 1922
  - Disestablished: 1959
Preceded by	Succeeded by
Shan States	Shan State; Kayah State

The Federated Shan States (Shan: မိူင်းႁူမ်ႈတုမ်ႊၸိုင်ႈတႆး Muang Hom Tum Jueng Tai; Burmese: ပဒေသရာဇ်ရှမ်းပြည်နယ်စု) was an administrative division of the British Empire made up by the much larger Shan States and the Karenni States during British rule in Burma.

The federation was established in order to facilitate the future transfer of the Shan principalities to the Governor of Burma. Unaware of the implications of the British political move, the Shan Saophas lost power in the process and had to contribute 50% of their revenue to the central fund as well. Their status was thus diminished from having been semi-sovereign rulers of princely states when the latter were established in 1888 to that of becoming a kind of tax collectors.

== History ==
Under the British colonial administration, the former Shan States consisted of nominally sovereign entities, each ruled by a local monarch, but administered by a single British commissioner. On 10 October 1922 the administrations of the Karenni states and the Shan states were officially clustered together in order to establish the Federated Shan States, under a British commissioner who also administered the Wa States.

On 27 May 1942, during World War II, Kengtung State was invaded and its capital captured by the Imperial Japanese Army. Following a previous agreement between Thai Prime Minister Plaek Phibunsongkhram and the Japanese Empire, in December the same year the Thai Phayap Army occupied the part of the Karenni states located between the Thai border and the Salween, corresponding to the eastern half of Kantarawadi State, as well as two districts of Mawkmai and four districts of Möngpan. The annexation by Thailand as Saharat Thai Doem northern province was formalised on 1 August 1943.

Following the existing agreement between Thai Prime Minister Plaek Phibunsongkhram (Phibun) and the Japanese Empire, on 18 August 1943, the Japanese government agreed to the Thai annexation of Kengtung and part of Mongpan state (as well as the annexation of Kelantan, Trengganu, Kedah, Perlis states and nearby islands in Malaya.) The other districts that the Thai government wanted in the southern Shan states and the Karenni states, all located east of the Salween River, were assigned by the Japanese to their client State of Burma in September 1943.

Thailand left the territory in 1945, but officially relinquished its claim over the territories of the Federated Shan States it had occupied only in 1946 as part of the condition for admission to the United Nations and the withdrawal of all wartime sanctions for having sided with the Axis powers.

=== Post-independence Burma ===
When Burma gained independence in 1948, the Federated Shan States became Shan State and Kayah State of the Union of Burma with the right to secede from the Union. Following the 1962 Burmese coup d'état, the status of the Shan States and the saophas' hereditary rights were removed by Gen. Ne Win's military government.

== See also ==
- Princely States
- Shan States
- Karenni States
