= Karenni States =

Former states in Myanmar

Coordinates: 18°30′N 98°00′E

- Princely states of British Burma
- 18th century–1959
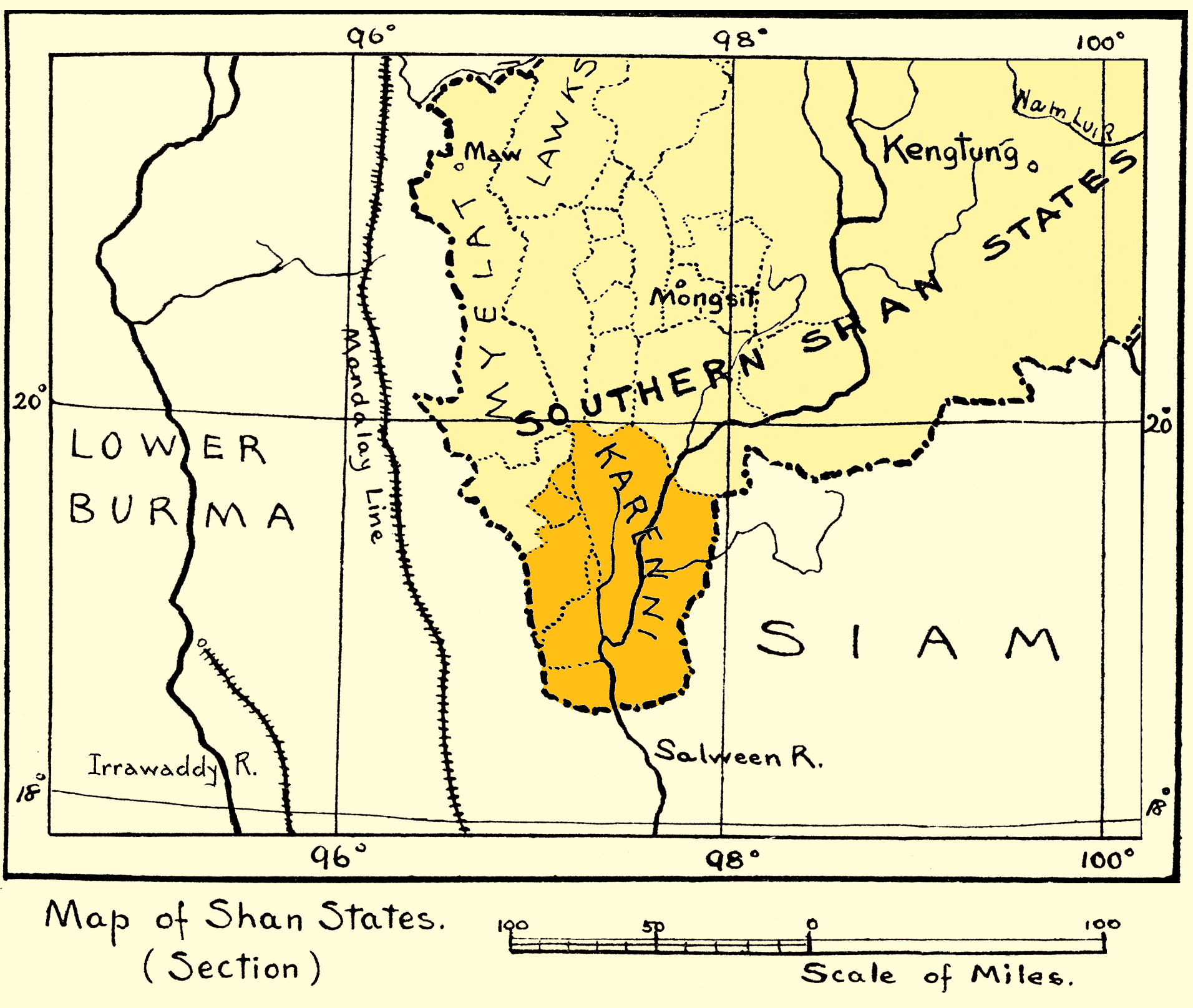
- 1917 map of the Karenni States
- Area
  - 1901: 8,106 km^{2} (3,130 sq mi)
- Population
  - 1901: 45,795
- Government
  - Type: Monarchy
- History
  - Independence of the feudatory Karenni predecessor state: 18th century
  - Abdication of the Kayah rulers: 1959
Preceded by	Succeeded by
Shan States	Kayah State

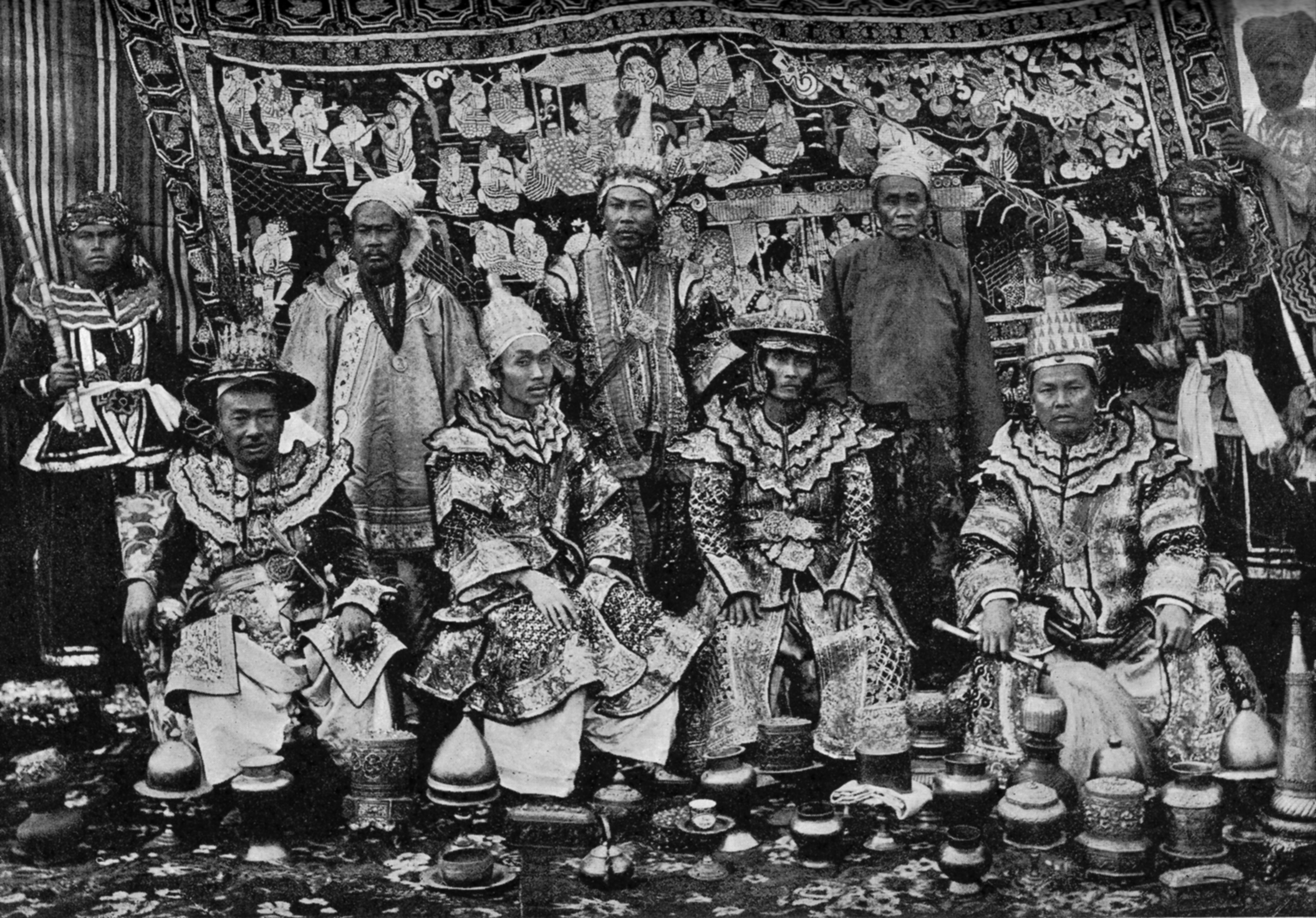
Karenni princes at the Delhi Durbar in 1903. The rulers of Bawlake, Kantarawadi and Kyebogyi standing in the back row.

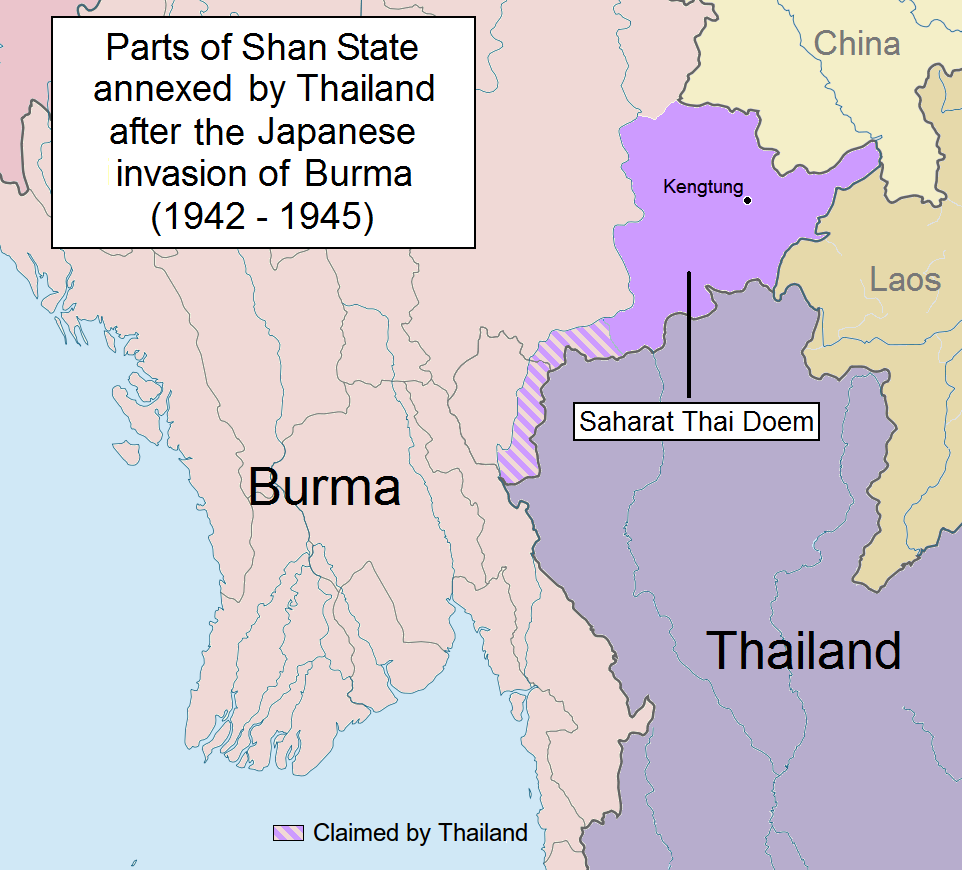
Territories claimed by Thailand in the Shan and Karenni States during World War II and Saharat Thai Doem northern province.

The Karenni States, also known as Red Karen States, was the name formerly given to the states inhabited mainly by the Red Karen, in the area of present-day Kayah State, eastern Burma. They were located south of the Federated Shan States and east of British Burma.

The British government recognised and guaranteed the independence of the Karenni States in an 1875 treaty with Burmese King Mindon Min, by which both parties recognised the area as belonging neither to Burma nor to the United Kingdom. Consequently, the Karenni States were never fully incorporated into British Burma. The Karenni states formed for a time the "Kayah State" in post-independent Burma, but on 29 April 1959 both the Shan and the Kayah rulers formally surrendered their ruling powers to the Burmese government.

== History ==
There are no historical data on the Karenni States before the 19th century. According to local tradition in the early times of the Karenni states there was a principality led by a "Sawphya" that was under the over lordship of a Shan prince. This state finally became independent in the 18th century. In the 19th century the Karenni state was divided into five principalities (sawphyas).

=== British rule in Burma ===
In 1864 a Karenni prince requested the status of British protectorate for his state, but the British authorities did not show any interest. After the death of this prince in 1869 his two sons renewed the petition claiming that they feared Burmese ambitions on their state. The British refused again, but agreed to arbitrate before the King of Burma. Since the Burmese monarchy insisted in their demands on the Karenni territories, the British granted recognition to four states, Kyebogyi, Namekan (Nammekon), Naungpale and Bawlake, which became independent under British protection on 21 June 1875. Kantarawadi state, however, remained independent without official protection.

The Karenni States were recognized as tributary to British Burma in 1892, when their rulers agreed to accept a stipend from the British government. An Assistant Superintendent of the Shan States was based at Loikaw as Agent of the British government. He exercised control over the local Karenni Rulers, being supervised by the Superintendent at Taunggyi.

On 10 October 1922 the administrations of the Karenni states (Bawlake, Kantarawaddy, and Kyebogyi) were placed under the administration of the Federated Shan States, established in 1900. under a commissioner who also administered the Wa States. This arrangement survived the constitutional changes of 1923 and 1937. By the 1930s, the Mawchi Mine in Bawlake was one of the most important sources of tungsten in the world.

On 27 May 1942, during World War II, nearby Kengtung State was invaded and its capital captured by the Thai Phayap Army. Following a previous agreement between Thai Prime Minister Plaek Phibunsongkhram and the Empire of Japan, in December the same year the Thai administration occupied Kengtung and parts of Möngpan. The annexation by Thailand as Saharat Thai Doem northern province was formalized on 1 August 1943.

Thailand left the territories in 1945, but officially relinquished its claim over the trans-Salween part of Kantarawadi State only in 1946 as part of the condition for admission to the United Nations and the withdrawal of all wartime sanctions for having sided with the Axis powers.

=== Post-independence Burma ===
The Constitution of the Union of Burma in 1947 proclaimed that the three Karenni States be amalgamated into a single constituent state of the union, called Karenni State. It also provided for the possibility of secession from the Union after 10 years. In 1952, the former Shan state of Mong Pai was added, and the whole renamed Kayah State, possibly with the intent of driving a wedge between the Karenni in Kayah State and the rest of the Karen people in Karen State, both fighting for independence.

The division failed, with the Karenni fighting alongside the other Karen peoples against the Myanmar dictatorship. Their military organisation, the Karen National Liberation Army (KNLA), had 20 000 members by the 1980s. However, the political branch of the KNLA, the Karen National Union (KNU), sought to resolve the conflict through political means. In 1992, it appointed Róbert Cey-Bert as its international ambassador, whose diplomatic efforts led to the KNU's admission to the Unrepresented Nations and Peoples Organization (UNPO) in 1993.

Under the Burmese government control, the states subjected to changes throughout the small state. Resources like the hydropower and mining led to massive military presence around the state; thus, leading many of its people without a home and more problems to arise. The heavy military presence had created issues that people of the state faces as consequences. Mistreatment of the local people include land taken away by the military, human rights violations like forced labor and sexual violence and overall safety of the people resulting from landmine planted around the state.

The armed conflict did not end there, however, with the KNU's new headquarters being established in Mu Aye Pu, on the Burma-Thai border. In 2004, the BBC, citing aid agencies, estimated that up to 200,000 Karen, including Karenni, had been displaced during the decades-long war, with a further 160,000 living in refugee camps on the Thai side of the border. The largest refugee camp is located in Mae La, Tak (ตาก) province, Thailand, which hosts around 50,000 Karen refugees.

In February 2010, reports said the Burmese army was continuously burning Karen villages, displacing thousands of people. Many Karen, including people such as Padoh Mahn Sha Lah Phan, former KNU secretary, and his daughter Zoya Phan, have accused the Myanmar military government of ethnic cleansing. The US State Department has also accused the Burmese government of suppressing religious freedom.

== States ==
There were five Karenni states, divided into two regions.

=== Western Karenni ===
The Western Karenni States were the four Karenni states located west of the Salween River:

- Kyebogyi, 350 square miles or 910 square kilometres, population 9,867 in 1901.
- Bawlake, 200 square miles or 520 square kilometres, population 5,701 in 1901.
- Naungpale, 30 square miles or 78 square kilometres, population 1,265 in 1901.
- Nammekon, 50 square miles or 130 square kilometres, population 2,629 in 1901.

=== Kantarawadi ===
Kantarawadi State was also known as "Eastern Karenni". It had an area of 2,500 square miles or 6,500 square kilometres and a population of 26,333 in 1901. More than half of its territory was located east of the Salween River, an area that was annexed by Thailand during World War II.

== See also ==
- Princely States
- Shan States
- Red Karen
