= Namaklwe =

Namaklwe ၼႃးမၵ်ႇလူၺ် နားမလွေ
- Village
- Location in Myanmar
- Coordinates: 19°48′24″N 98°56′30″E
- Country: Myanmar
- State: Shan State
- District: Mong Hsat District
- Township: Mong Ton Township
- Town: Ponparkyin
- Time zone: UTC+6.30 (MST)

Namaklwe is a village near the Burma-Thai border in Mong Ton Township, Mong Hsat District of Shan State in eastern Myanmar, across the border from BP1, Myanmar to Nong Uk known at Arunothai Village, Thailand at Kew Pha Wok Border check point . It lies along National Highway 22 which connects it to Ponparkyin in the north, and Chiang Mai may be accessed to the south. It has been a site of conflict when the Burma Frontier Force once gunned down Siamese invaders at Namaklwe.
