= National Highway 45 (Myanmar) =

Road in Myanmar

National Highway 45
- အမှတ် 45 ပြည်ထောင်စုလမ်းမကြီး

Major junctions
- East end: Nansang
- West end: Namaklwe

Location
- Country: Myanmar
- States: Shan State
- Major cities: Mong Nai, Langkho, Mong Pan, Mong Ton, Namaklwe

Highway system
- Transport in Myanmar

National Highway 45 (NH45) is a highway of eastern Burma, passing through Shan State. It connects Nansang to Mong Ton and the Thai border in the southeast.

The highway is fed by the National Highway 4 at Nansang at 20°53′N 97°43′E just west of Nansang Airport. It passes in a SSE direction through Mong Nai until Langkho when it mostly heads east to Mong Pan and then NEE and southeast to Mong Ton where it connects with National Highway 49 at 20°17′59″N 98°53′44″E. It then heads south to the Thai border where it ends just south of Namaklwe at 19°46′13″N 98°57′10″E.
