= CIA activities in Myanmar =

CIA activities in Myanmar were operations by the Central Intelligence Agency and before that the Office of Strategic Services (OSS) from World War II onward in the nation formerly known as Burma. There appears to be somewhat limited information concerning CIA operations in Myanmar, as compared to other nations, such as Vietnam.

== World War II ==
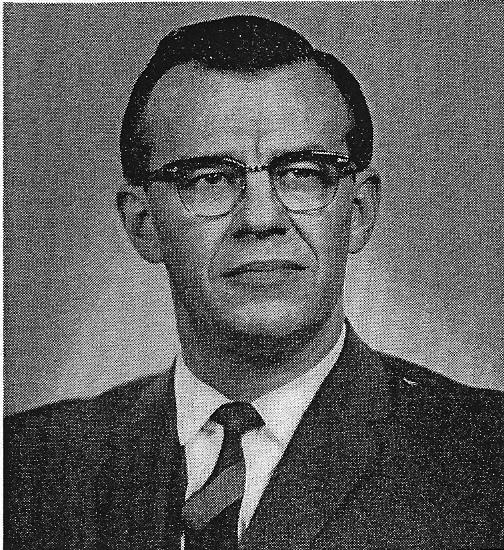
Roger Hilsman, c. 1964

During World War II, OSS operations in Burma at the time, focused on fighting the Japanese occupation of Myanmar. During what was known as the Burma Campaign, the OSS aided British forces by organizing resistance to the Japanese occupiers among indigenous ethnic groups. The Burma Campaign commenced following the Japanese conquest of Myanmar in 1942.

Roger Hilsman, later to become Assistant Secretary of State for Intelligence and Research, was a veteran of the efforts to form partisan anti-Japanese resistance fighters among the various ethnic groups within Myanmar. Hilsman's experiences in these efforts instilled within him a penchant for guerrilla warfare, as well as for the importance of popular mobilization during counterinsurgency operations, both of which would influence his approach to the later Vietnam War.

== Cold War ==
According to released documents from the National Security Archive, the United States continuously worried about communist influence in Myanmar during the Cold War. A main concern was over economic warfare. Since the country was a major exporter of rice, the United States worried that communist control of Myanmar could result in manipulation of price and distribution of Myanmar rice to the detriment of nearby United States allies, such as India, Ceylon, Malaysia, and Japan.

=== Kuomintang in Myanmar ===
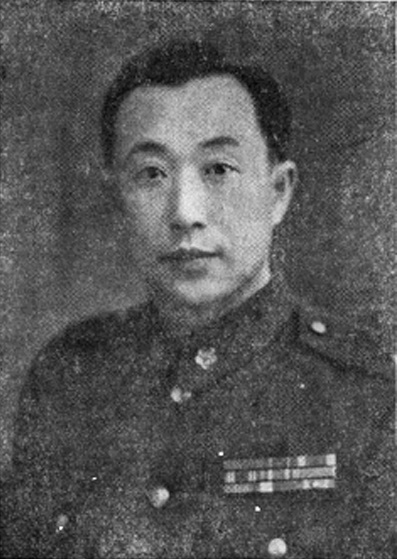
Lieutenant General Li Mi, Chinese nationalist general

At the close of the Korean War, one of the final operational theaters involving the CIA was in northern Myanmar. This operation was a strategic attempt to diminish attacks against General MacArthur's forces in the north. Li Mi, a Chinese nationalist general, had roughly 1500 soldiers trapped in northern Myanmar. The CIA trained nationalist Chinese soldiers in Thailand, armed them, and dropped them into northern Myanmar. Maoist forces awaited them, easily slaughtering many of them, thanks to a communist informant in Bangkok. CIA officer Desmond Fitzgerald attempted to correct the situation by dropping more weapons and ammunition into the area. The soldiers, however, refused to fight, and instead settled in the area, growing poppies, and intermarrying with locals. This blunder by the CIA resulted in Li Mi running a major heroin operation, which the CIA saw fit to eradicate twenty years later.

In 1952, in an effort to bolster Li Mi's forces, 700 men were airlifted from Taiwan. Over the course of 1952 and 1953, flights carrying weapons and ammunition arrived in Mong Hsat in the Shan State of Myanmar on nearly a daily basis. Several tons of medical supplies and communication equipment were flown in as well. General Li Mi reported that such numbers were exaggerated, however, suggesting that there had only been 20 deliveries to Mong Hsat in 1952, and that each plane could only carry ten people and one ton of payload.

=== Chemical Weapons Allegations ===
A CIA document from 1988 suggests that Burma had a small chemical weapons production facility, supposedly built with the help of West Germany in the early 1980s. The document claims that the facility had produced mustard gas in the past, but had ceased production. The document also goes on to state that ethnic insurgents in Burma have claimed that the Army was importing chemical weapons from China, but the CIA was unable to verify such claims.

== Post-Cold War ==
On 10 September 2007, the Myanmar government accused the CIA of assassinating a rebel Karen commander from the Karen National Union who wanted to negotiate with the military government.

According to media reports citing documents published by Germany's Der Spiegel in 2010, the Embassy of the United States in Yangon is the site of an electronic surveillance facility used to monitor telephones and communications networks. The facility is run jointly by the Central Intelligence Agency (CIA) and the National Security Agency (NSA) through a group known as Special Collection Service.

In 2011 the Guardian published leaked diplomatic cable information regarding Myanmar. The cables revealed that the US funded some of the civil society groups in Myanmar that forced the government to suspend the controversial Chinese Myitsone Dam on the Irrawaddy river.

== See also ==
- Myanmar–United States relations
