= Möng Pan State =

Coordinates: 20°06′N 98°37′E

Möng Pan မိုင်းပန်နယ်
- State of the Shan States
- 1637–1959
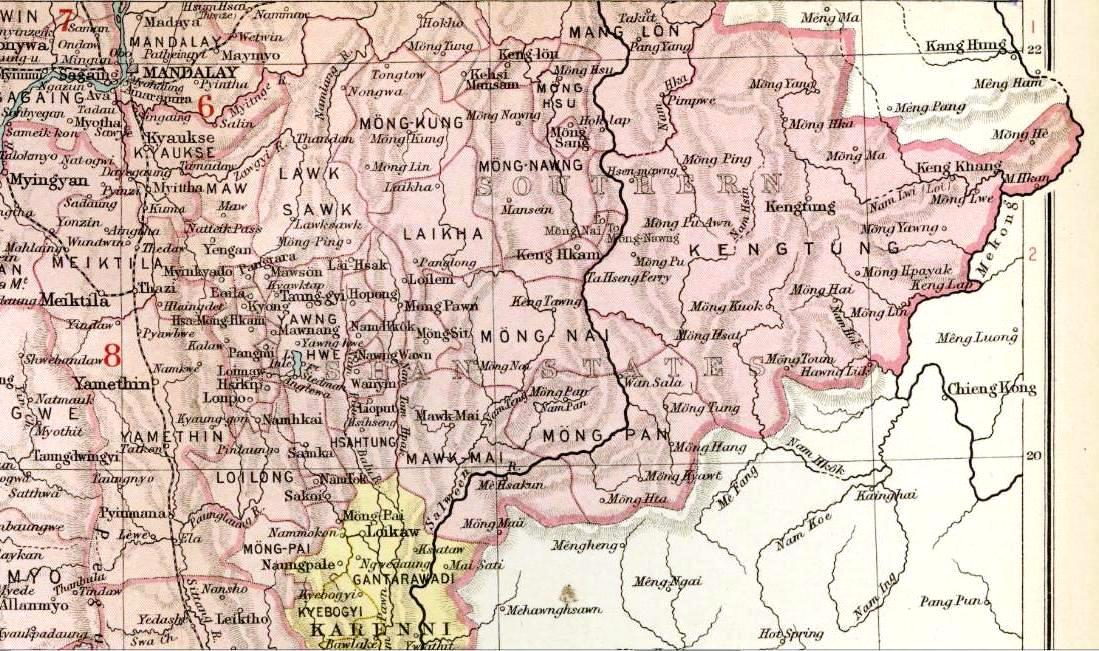
- Möng Pan in an Imperial Gazetteer of India map
- Capital: Mong Pan
- Area
  - 1901: 3,703 km^{2} (1,430 sq mi)
- Population
  - 1901: 16,629
- History
  - State founded: 1637
  - Abdication of the last Saopha: 1959
Preceded by	Succeeded by
Hsenwi	Shan State

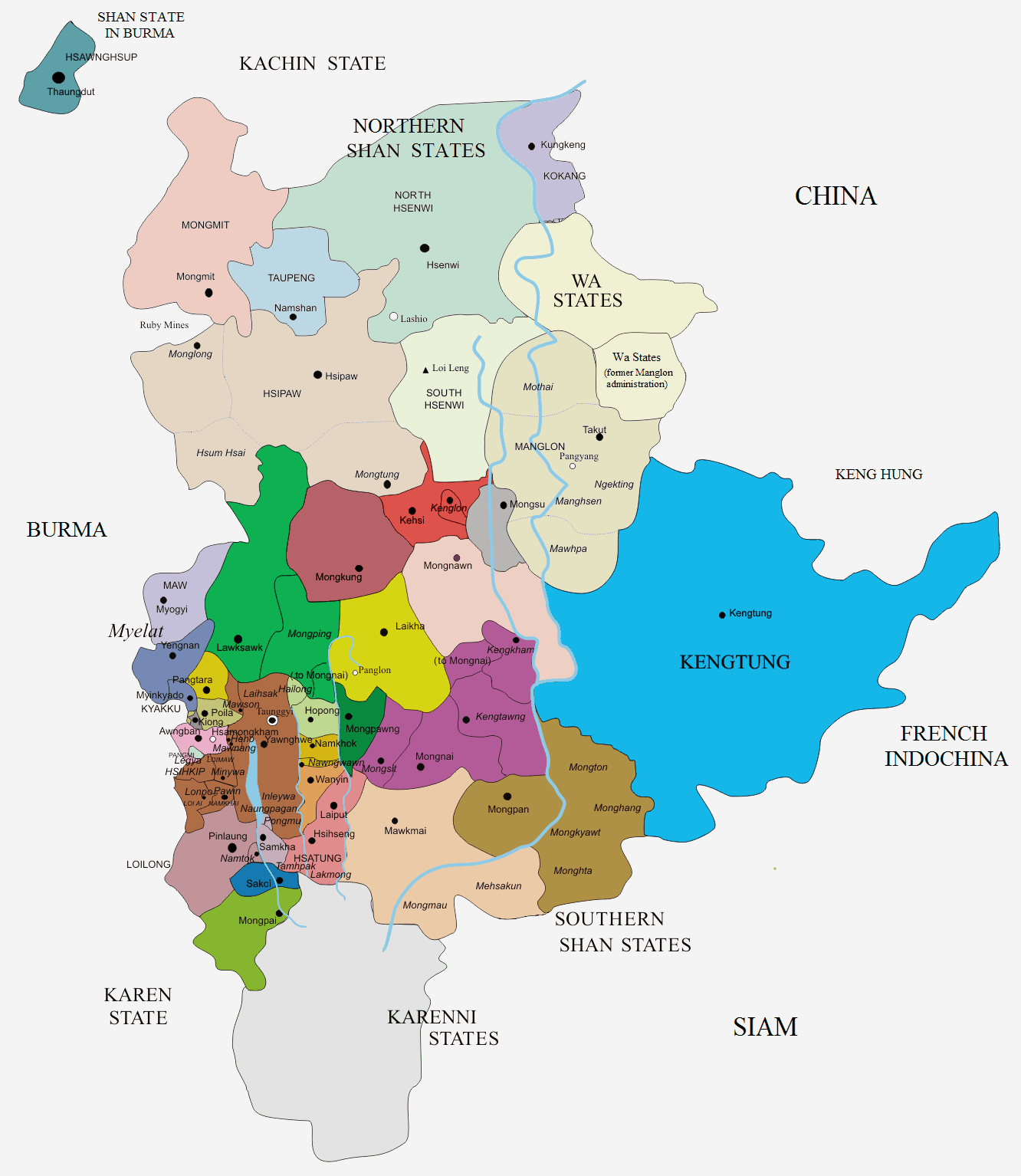
Map of the Shan States showing the four trans-Salween districts that were annexed by Thailand in WW II.

Möng Pan, also known as Maingpan (Burmese: မိုင်းပန်) was a Shan state in what is today Burma. It belonged to the Eastern Division of the Southern Shan States.

The town of Möng Pan was formerly the residence of the Sawbwa of Möng Pan. The capital is in the middle of a fertile plain. Most of the other areas of the state are mountainous, rich in teak forests. Loi Hkilek, a 2,133 high mountain is located in Mongkyawt District.

== History ==
According to legend there had been a predecessor state. Möng Pan was founded in 1637, but little is known of the history of the state before the times of British Burma.

The four districts of Mongtang, Monghang, Mongkyawt and Monghta, located east of the Salween were historically claimed by Siam, but the British upheld the view that they belonged to the Cis-Salween Sawbwa of Möng Pan. In 1888 Siamese troops were posted in the four trans-Salween districts; Siam also claimed a further district, Möng Hsat, but posted no troops there.

In 1889 the British formed the 1889-90 Anglo-Siamese Boundary Commission, in order to solve the difficulties with Siam concerning the trans-Salween dependencies of Mawkmai, Möng Pan, and Karenni. This commission however, would not be successful for Siam declined to join it at the last moment. Nevertheless, the commission went ahead despite the lack of agreement from the Siamese government and brought about the partition of these tracts and their incorporation into British Burma. British troops forced the Siamese garrisons to withdraw from the territories of the trans-Salween that were deemed not to belong to Siam. Finally the demarcation of the new frontier was carried out by the joint 1892-3 Anglo-Siamese Boundary Commission.

Between December 1943 and 1945 the occupying Japanese allowed the government of Siam to annex all four districts of Möng Pan east of the Salween as part of the Saharat Thai Doem territory —together with Kengtung State.

=== Rulers ===
The rulers of Möng Pan bore the title of Saopha after 1867; their ritual style was Kambawsa Mahawuntha Thirdamaraza.

==== Myozas ====
- 1637 - .... Tawk La
- .... - .... Twak Hkam
- .... - .... Twak Twe
- .... - .... Op La
- .... - .... Hkun Som
- .... - .... Shwe Tong
- .... - .... Sai U
- .... - .... Sai Nyo
- .... - 1809 Naw Hkam (d. 1809)
- 1809 - 1823 Mana Ne Myo (d. 1823)
- 1823 - 1858 Maung Shwe Hkam (d. 1858)
- 1858 - 1867 Hkun Tun U (d. 1886)

==== Saophas ====
- 1867 - 1886 Hkun Tun U (s.a.)
- 1886 - 1918 Hkun Num Leng (b. 1869 - d. 1918)
- 1918 - 1952 Hkun On

== See also ==
- Anglo-Siamese Treaty of 1909
