= Loi Hkilek =

Mountain in Burma

- Loi Kyi-lek
- Location within Myanmar

Highest point
- Elevation: 1,973 m (6,473 ft)
- Listing: List of mountains in Burma
- Coordinates: 20°2′32″N 98°49′19″E

Geography
- Location: Shan State, Myanmar
- Parent range: Shan Hills

Climbing
- First ascent: unknown
- Easiest route: climb

Loi Hkilek or Loi Kyi-lek is a mountain of the Shan Hills, in Shan State, Burma.

== Geography ==
Loi Hkilek is located about 11 km to the northeast of Möng Kyawt (Mongkyawt) in Mong Ton Township of Mongsat District. Although it is mentioned in the Imperial Gazetteer of India as "a mountain nearly 7,000 feet [2,133 m] high", its actual elevation is 1,973 m.

== See also ==
- List of mountains in Burma
