= State of Burma =

Puppet state of the Empire of Japan from 1943–1945

Coordinates: 16°50′47″N 96°10′09″E

State of Burma ဗမာနိုင်ငံတော် (Burmese) ビルマ國 (Japanese)
- 1943–1945
- State flag State seal
- Motto: တသွေး၊ တသံ၊ တမိန့် t sway, t san, t min "One Blood, One Voice, One Order"
- Anthem: "တို့ဗမာသီချင်း"; Dobama Thachin "Our Burma Song"
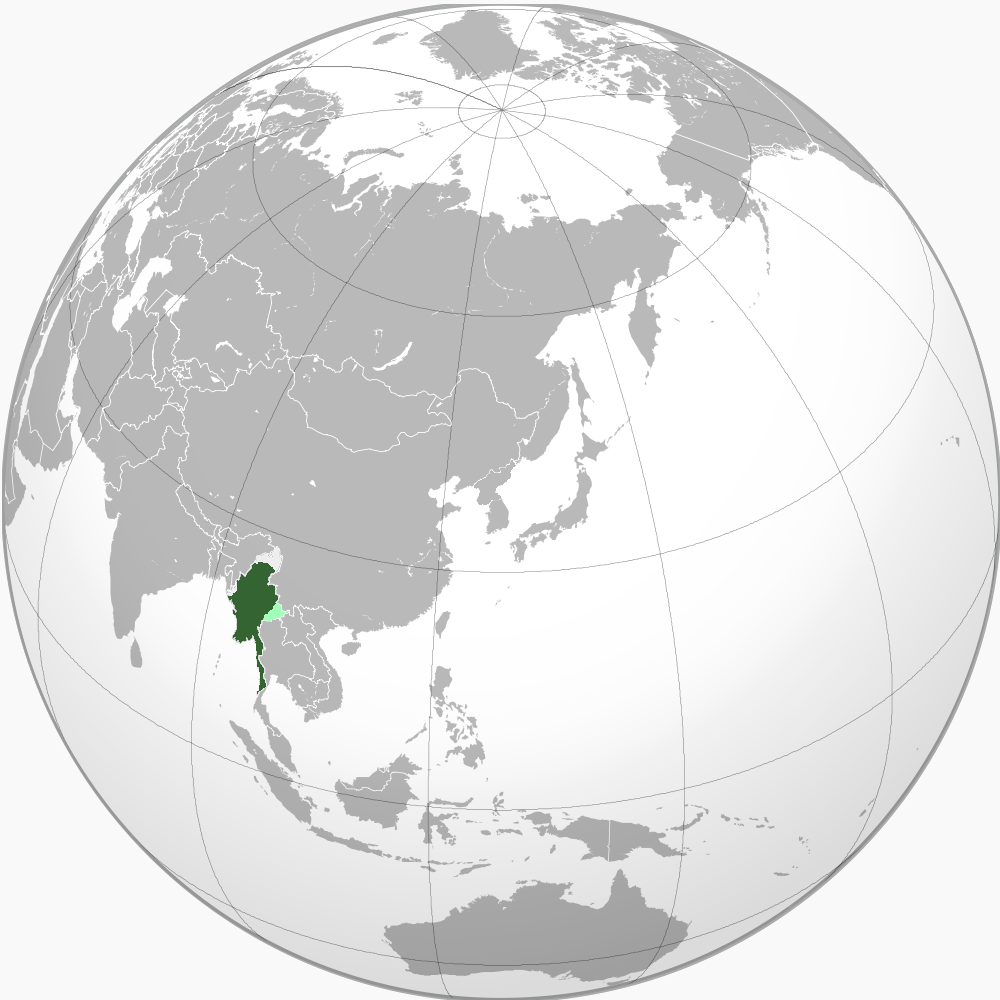
- Green: Under government authority Light silver: Remainder of British Burma; Light green: Annexed by Thailand
- Status: Puppet state of the Empire of Japan
- Capital: Rangoon
- Official languages: Burmese; English; Japanese
- Common languages: Shan, Karen, Kachin, Rakhine, Mon, Karenni, Chin, Kokang
- Religion: State Shinto; Buddhism; Christianity
- Demonym: Burmese
- Government: Dictatorship
- Nainggandaw Adipati
  - 1943–1945: Ba Maw
- Prime Minister
  - 1943–1945: Ba Maw
- Deputy Prime Minister
  - 1943–1945: Aung San
- Historical era: World War II
  - Independence: 1 August 1943
  - Government evacuation: 19 August 1945
- Currency: Rupee
Preceded by	Succeeded by
Japanese Military Administration	British Burma
- Today part of: Myanmar

The State of Burma (Burmese: ဗမာနိုင်ငံတော်, MLCTS: ba.ma nuingngamtau; Japanese: ビルマ國, Biruma-koku) was a Japanese puppet state established in 1943 during the Japanese occupation of Burma in World War II.

== Background ==
During the early stages of World War II, the Empire of Japan invaded British Burma primarily to obtain raw materials (which included oil from fields around Yenangyaung, minerals and large surpluses of rice), and to close off the Burma Road, which was a primary link for aid and munitions to the Chinese Nationalist forces of Chiang Kai-shek which had been fighting the Japanese for several years in the Second Sino-Japanese War.

The Japanese Fifteenth Army under Lieutenant General Shojiro Iida quickly overran Burma from January – May 1942. The Japanese had also assisted the formation of the Burma Independence Army (BIA), which aided the Japanese during their invasion. The BIA formed a provisional government in some areas of the country in the spring of 1942, but there were differences within the Japanese leadership over the future of Burma. While Colonel Suzuki encouraged the BIA to form a provisional government, the Japanese military leadership had never formally accepted such a plan and the Japanese government held out only vague promises of independence after the end of the war. However, a Burmese Executive Administration was established in Rangoon on 1 August 1942 with the aim of creating a civil administration to manage day-to-day administrative activities subordinate to the Japanese military administration. The head of the provisional administration was Dr. Ba Maw, a lawyer and political prisoner under the British.

== National symbols ==
The State of Burma adopted the nationalist symbols as the State's symbols to persuade nationalists.

- The first version of Burmese Tricolour as the State's flag.
- The Dobama Anthem (de facto anthem of anti-British) as the State's anthem.
- Burmese as the State's official language.

== Administrative divisions ==
The State of Burma was divided into four Divisions (တိုင်း);

- (1) Northern Division (မြောက်ပိုင်းတိုင်း)
- (2) Western Division (အနောက်ပိုင်းတိုင်း)
- (3) Southern Division (တောင်ပိုင်းတိုင်း)
- (4) Kambawza Division (ကမ္ဘောဇတိုင်း)

The Kambawza Division, made up of Shan States and Karenni States, was put under the direct administration of the head of state.

== Greater East Asia Co-Prosperity Sphere ==
As the war situation gradually turned against the Japanese, the Japanese government decided that Burma and the Philippines would become fully independent as part of the Greater East Asia Co-Prosperity Sphere, contrary to the original plan that independence only be granted after the completion of the war. Japanese Prime Minister Hideki Tōjō promised that independence for Burma would be granted within a year from 28 January 1943, with the condition that Burma declare war on the United Kingdom and the United States. The Japanese government felt that this would give the Burmese a real stake in an Axis victory in the Second World War, creating resistance against possible re-colonization by the Western powers, and increased military and economic support from Burma for the Japanese war effort.

A Burma Independence Preparatory Committee, chaired by Ba Maw, was formed on 8 May 1943 with a wide variety of respected members. On 1 August 1943, Burma was proclaimed the independent State of Burma and the Japanese military government for Burma was officially dissolved. The new state quickly declared war on the United Kingdom and the United States and concluded a Treaty of Alliance with Japan.

Ba Maw became "Naingandaw Adipadi" (head of state) of Burma under the new constitution, with effectively unbridled powers.

=== Government of the State of Burma ===
The first cabinet of the State of Burma consisted of:

- Ba Maw, Prime Minister (in addition to his post as head of state)
- General Aung San, Deputy Prime Minister
- Ba Win, Minister of Home Affairs
- Thakin Nu, Minister of Foreign Affairs
- Dr. Thein Maung, Minister of Finance (later replaced by U Set after he was appointed to be Burman ambassador to Japan)
- General Aung San, Minister of Defence
- Thein Maung, Minister of Justice
- Hla Min, Minister of Education and Health
- Thakin Than Tun, Minister of Agriculture (later became Minister of Transport)
- U Mya, Minister of Commerce and Industry
- Thakin Lay Maung, Minister of Communications and Irrigation
- Bandula U Sein, Minister of Welfare and Publicity
- Tun Aung, Minister of Co-Operation with Japan
- Thakin Lun Baw, Public Works Recovery Minister

The state’s only legal political party was Dobama-Sinyetha Asiayone. Ba Maw ruled the new fascist state as a totalitarian dictator.

On 25 September 1943, as promised, Japan ceded all of the Shan states to Burma except for the part east of the Salween River i.e., Kengtung and Mongpan, which had already been given to Thailand. Ba Maw attended the Greater East Asia Conference in Tokyo from 5–6 November 1943.

Though now nominally independent, the power of the State of Burma to exercise its sovereignty was largely circumscribed by wartime agreements with Japan. The Imperial Japanese Army maintained a large presence and continued to act arbitrarily, despite Japan no longer having official control over Burma.

During 1943 and 1944, the Burma National Army made contacts with other political groups inside Burma, including the Communist Party of Burma which had been operating underground. Eventually, a popular front organization called the Anti-Fascist Organisation (AFO) was formed with Thakin Soe as the leader. Through the communists and the Japanese-sponsored Arakan Defence Army, the Burmese were eventually able to make contact with the British Force 136 in India. The initial contacts were always indirect. Force 136 was also able to make contacts with members of the BNA's Karen unit in Rangoon.

In December 1944, the AFO contacted the Allies, indicating their readiness to defect to the Allied cause by launching a national uprising which would include the forces of the BNA. However, this was opposed by the British, who, considering the timing to be unfavorable, had considerable reservations about supporting the BNA. The first BNA-led uprising against the Japanese occurred early in 1945 in central Burma.

On 27 March 1945, the remainder of the BNA paraded in Rangoon and marched out ostensibly to assist the Japanese army in the battles then raging in Central Burma against invading Allied forces. Instead, the BNA openly declared war on the Japanese. Aung San and others subsequently began negotiations with Lord Mountbatten and officially joined the Allies as the Patriotic Burmese Forces. Without the support of the BNA, the government of the State of Burma quickly collapsed, and Ba Maw fled via Thailand to Japan, where he was captured later that year and was held in Sugamo Prison, Tokyo, until 1946.

== See also ==
- Burma Independence Army
- Japanese occupation of Burma
- Saharat Thai Doem
- Yano Stamp
