= Mong Pan Township =

Mong Pan Möng Pawn
- Township
- Location in Langkho district
- Coordinates: 20°19′10″N 98°21′45″E
- Country: Myanmar
- State: Shan State
- District: Langkho District
- Elevation: 815 m (2,674 ft)
- Time zone: UTC+6.30 (MST)

Mong Pan Township (Möng Pan or Möng Pawn) is a township of Langkho District in the Shan State of Myanmar. The capital town is Mong Pan or Möngpan, formerly the residence of the Sawbwa.

To the south it borders Mae Hong Son Province in Thailand and lies west of the Salween River.

== History ==
Originally, Mong Pan was one of the many smaller states that made up the Shan region of Myanmar, but later it became part of Shan State. In the center lies a fertile intermontane basin bounded by the Shan Hills which reach heights of 1,600 metres (5,200 ft). The surrounding mountainous area is covered with forest.

The four districts of Möng Tang, Möng Hang, Möng Kyawt and Möng Hta, located to the south on the eastern bank of the Salween belonged to the Cis-Salween Sawbwa of Möngpan. In 1888 there was trouble owing to the action of the Siamese, who attempted to take possession of them. The districts were annexed by Thailand in 1942, following the Japanese invasion of Burma and were added to the Saharat Thai Doem territory. They were returned to British Burma at the end of World War II.
