= Western Karenni =

- Princely States of the Karenni States
- 1875–1959
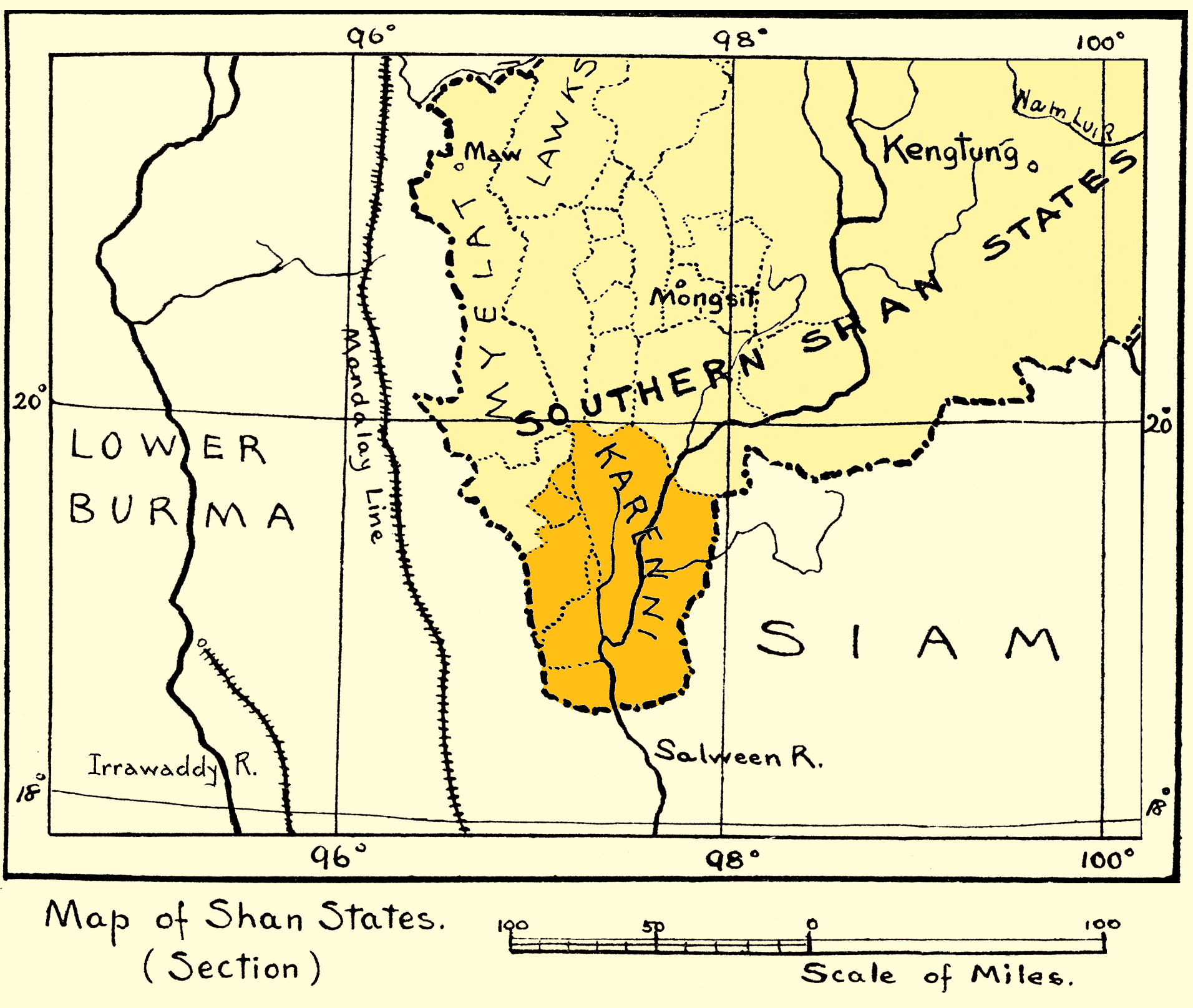
- 1917 map of the Karenni States
- Area
  - 1901: 1,631 km^{2} (630 sq mi)
- Population
  - 1901: 19,964
  - Type: Monarchy
- History
  - Independence under British protection: 21 June 1875
  - Abdication of the Kayah rulers: 1959
Preceded by	Succeeded by
Shan States	Kayah State

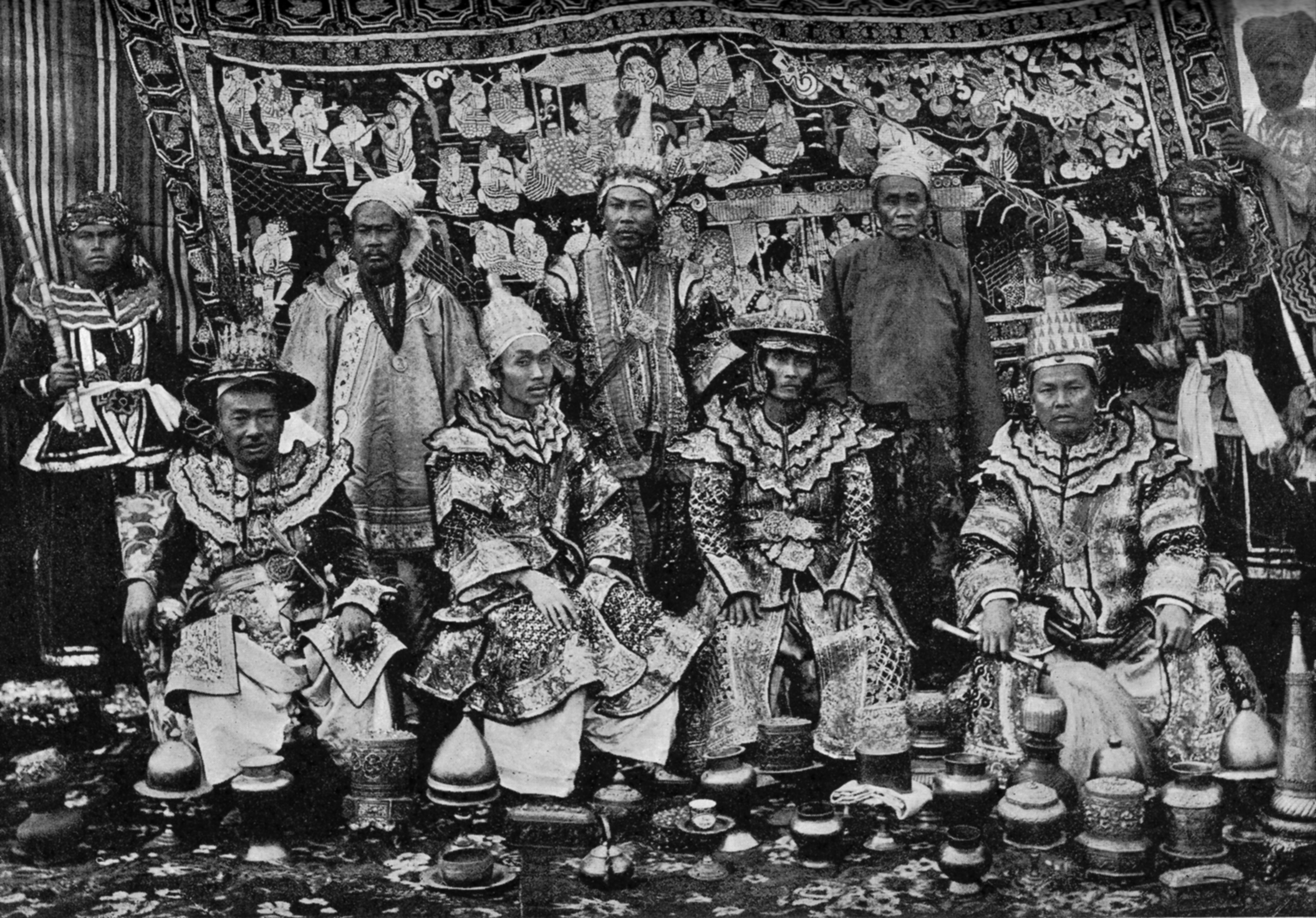
The rulers of Bawlake, Kantarawadi and Kyebogyi (standing in the back row), at the Delhi Durbar in 1903

Western Karenni was the collective name for the four Karenni States located west of the Salween River: Bawlake, Nammekon, Naungpale, and Kyebogyi. On 21 June 1875, the government of British India and king Mindon of Burma signed a treaty recognizing the independence of Western Karenni. On 23 January 1892, Western Karenni was incorporated into British India as a protectorate.

== History ==
In 1864 a Karenni prince requested the status of British protectorate for his state, but the British authorities did not show any interest. After the death of this prince in 1869 his two sons renewed the petition claiming that they feared Burmese ambitions on their state. The British refused again, but agreed to arbitrate before the King of Burma. Since the Burmese monarchy insisted in their demands on the Karenni territories, the British granted recognition to four states, Kyebogyi, Namekan (Nammekon), Naungpale and Bawlake, which became independent under British protection on 21 June 1875.

== States ==
=== Kyebogyi ===
Kyebogyi had an area of 350 square miles or 910 square kilometres and a population of 9,867 in 1901. The rulers bore the title of Myoza.

==== Myozas ====
- 1845 - 1890 ....
- 1890 - 27 Jan 1908 Hkun U (b. 18.. - d. 1908)
- 12 Jun 1908 - 1933 Hkun Sao (b. 1857 - d. 1933)
- 1933 - 1948 Vacant

=== Bawlake ===
Bawlake had an area of 200 square miles or 520 square kilometres and a population of 5,701 in 1901. The rulers bore the title of Myoza after 1892.

==== Rulers ====
- 1810? - 1850? Po Bya Hla
- 1850? - 1872 La Kye
- 1872 - 23 Jan 1892 Paban (b. 1857 - d. 1916)

===== Myozas =====
- 23 Jan 1892 - 1916 Paban (s.a.)
- 1916 - 1948 Hkun Nge (b. 1894 - d. 19..)

=== Naungpale ===
Naungpale had an area of 30 square miles or 78 square kilometres and a population of 1,265 in 1901. The rulers bore the title of Myoza after 1892.

==== Rulers ====
- 1845 - 23 Jan 1892 ....

===== Myozas =====
- 23 Jan 1892 - 1897 ....
- 8 Jul 1897 - 1916 Hkun Che (b. 1857 - d. 1916)
- 1916 - 19.. ....

=== Nammekon ===
Nammekon had an area of 50 square miles or 130 square kilometres and a population of 2,629 in 1901. The rulers bore the title of Myoza.

==== Myozas ====
- c.1860 - 1892 Po Bya
- 1892 - 1899 Vacant?
- 1899 - 1902 Hkun Baw (b. 1870 - d. af.1902)
- 1903 - 19.. Pra To (b. 1863 - d. 19..)

== See also ==
- Kantarawadi, also known as "Eastern Karenni".
