= Yano Stamp =

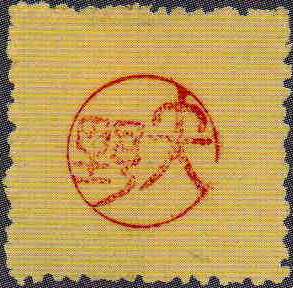
Yano Stamp (1942)

The Yano Stamp was temporarily issued in 1942 during World War II in Japanese-occupied Burma. During the fighting, printed stamps stocked in Rangoon by the British Burmese government were looted, and the personal seal of Shizuo Yano (矢野静雄, "矢野" is the family name), then chairman of the Burmese Postal Reconstruction Committee, was stamped in red ink on a piece of paper. 45,760 copies were produced between May 28 and 29. The stamps were sold for some time after the June 1 printed stamps were prepared. Yano Stamps is not the official name given by the government; it is a common name.

There are many stamps with similar seals, such as those issued by the Republic of Formosa, which rose up against Japanese colonization of Taiwan immediately after the First Sino-Japanese War, but most have the name of the country or postal service organization and the face value.

== History ==
In May 1942, Japanese forces invaded and occupied British Burma (see Burma campaign.)

The Japanese military decided to resume Burma's postal services, which had been suspended due to war damage, on June 1 of the same year.

Since the previous stamps at the central post office had already been lost, it was decided to issue a temporary stamp with a plowing cattle design.

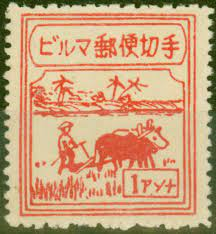
Stamp with a plowing cattle design sold after the Yano stamps. The face value of this stamp is "1アンナ(anna)". 1 anna equal to 1/16≈0.063 of a rupee. "ビルマ郵便切手" means Burmese postage stamp.

However, the stamps could not be manufactured in time for the resumption date. Therefore, the stamps were hastily produced using the personal seal of Shizuo Yano, who was in charge of postal affairs at the site.

The stamps were produced between May 28 and 29 using the personal seal (quartz, 13.5 mm in diameter) of Shizuo Yano, who was the chairman of the Burma Postal Reconstruction Committee. The seal had scratches from the beginning, but since it was abused more than 40,000 times in a short period of time, some of the outlines were missing toward the end due to wear. Yano's subordinates, Makino Koichi and Aoi Takeo, were in charge of the production.

Stamps were mainly made from English white paper with yellowish tints and English text watermarks, which was available at the printing factory in Insein Prison, located in the suburbs of Rangoon. (Unmarked paper was also used.) Holes for separating the stamps were made using a foot-pedal-type machine found in the prison. For this reason, the stamps were of unequal sizes, ranging from 24mm square to 26mmx30mm rectangular. The stamp sheets thus prepared were transported to the Post and Telecommunications Division of the Military Affairs Department, where they were stamped with Yano's seal of approval. One sheet was 104 sheets, 13 vertical and 8 horizontal. There were 440 sheets produced. The total number of stamps issued was 45,760.

These Yano stamps, which had neither face value nor country name, were issued on June 1 as a substitute for the 1 Anna stamps. From June 15, the aforementioned printed stamps were issued, but they were sold for some time. Since the stock of Yano stamps was not discarded but left behind, they were disposed of by the Allies who seized them after the war, and since there were many counterfeits, there are many remaining and they can be obtained at a relatively low price.

== See also ==
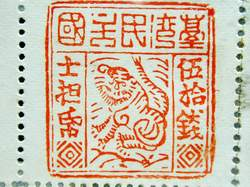
The Republic of Formosa issued a stamp using the seal in 1895. "國主民湾臺" is the name of the country.

- Japanese military currency (1937–1945)
- State of Burma
- Postage stamps and postal history of Taiwan
