= Möng Kyawt =

Village in Shan State, Myanmar

Möng Kyawt မိူင်းၵျွတ်ႈ မိုင်းကျွတ်
- Village
- Location in Myanmar
- Coordinates: 19°56′N 98°44′E
- Country: Myanmar
- State: Shan State
- District: Mong Hsat District
- Township: Mong Ton Township
- Town: Ponparkyin
- Elevation: 622 m (2,042 ft)
- Time zone: UTC+6.30 (MST)

Möng Kyawt, also known as Mongkyawt, is a village in Hway Aww Village Tract, Ponparkyin and Mong Ton Township of Mong Hsat District, Shan State, eastern Myanmar (Burma).

== Geography ==
Möng Kyawt is located in a mountainous area; Loi Hkilek, a 1,973 m (6,473 ft) high mountain is located about 11 km (6.8 mi) to the northeast of Möng Kyawt.

== History ==
At the time of the Shan States this town was the capital of Mongkyawt District, its actual elevation is 1,973 m (6,473 ft). together with Möng Tang, Möng Hang and Möng Hta, one of the four trans-Salween districts of Mongpan State formerly claimed by Thailand as unlawfully occupied by British Burma.

After having occupied parts of Burma, the Japanese Empire agreed to the Thai annexation of Kengtung State and the trans-Salween areas claimed by Thailand. The Thai army evacuated the Shan States only in August 1945.

== Bibliography ==
- Aung Tun, Sai (2009). History of the Shan State: From Its Origins to 1962. Chiang Mai: Silk Worm Books. ISBN 978-974-9511-43-5.
