= Kandarawadi =

Karenni State in present-day Kayah, Burma

Kantarawadi (Eastern Karenni) ကန္ဒရဝတီ
- Princely State of the Karenni States
- 18th century–1959
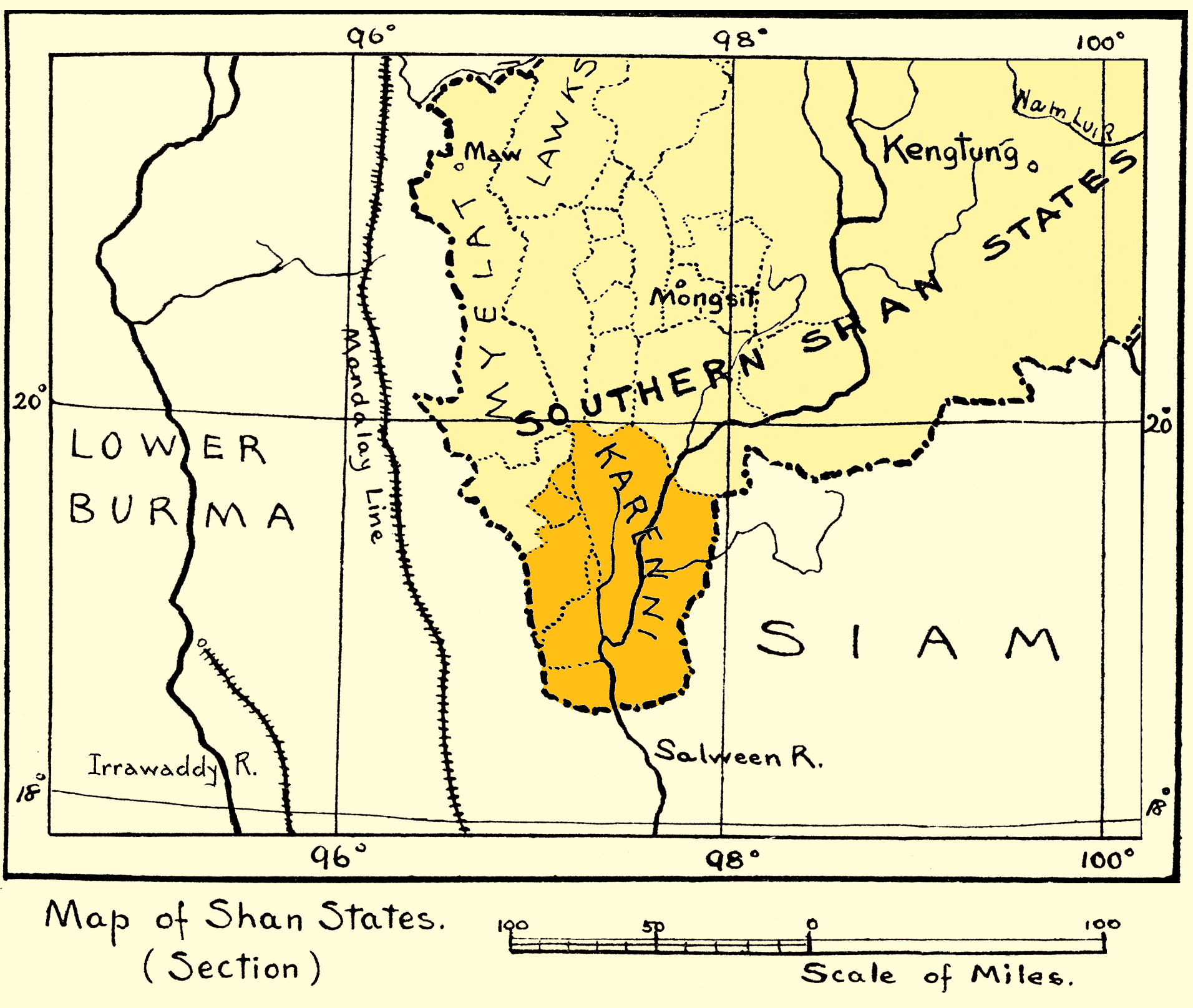
- 1917 map of the Karenni States
- Area
  - 1931: 6,475 km^{2} (2,500 sq mi)
- Population
  - 1931: 30,677
  - Type: Monarchy
- History
  - Independence: 18th century
  - Abdication of the Kayah rulers: 1959
Preceded by	Succeeded by
Shan States	Kayah State

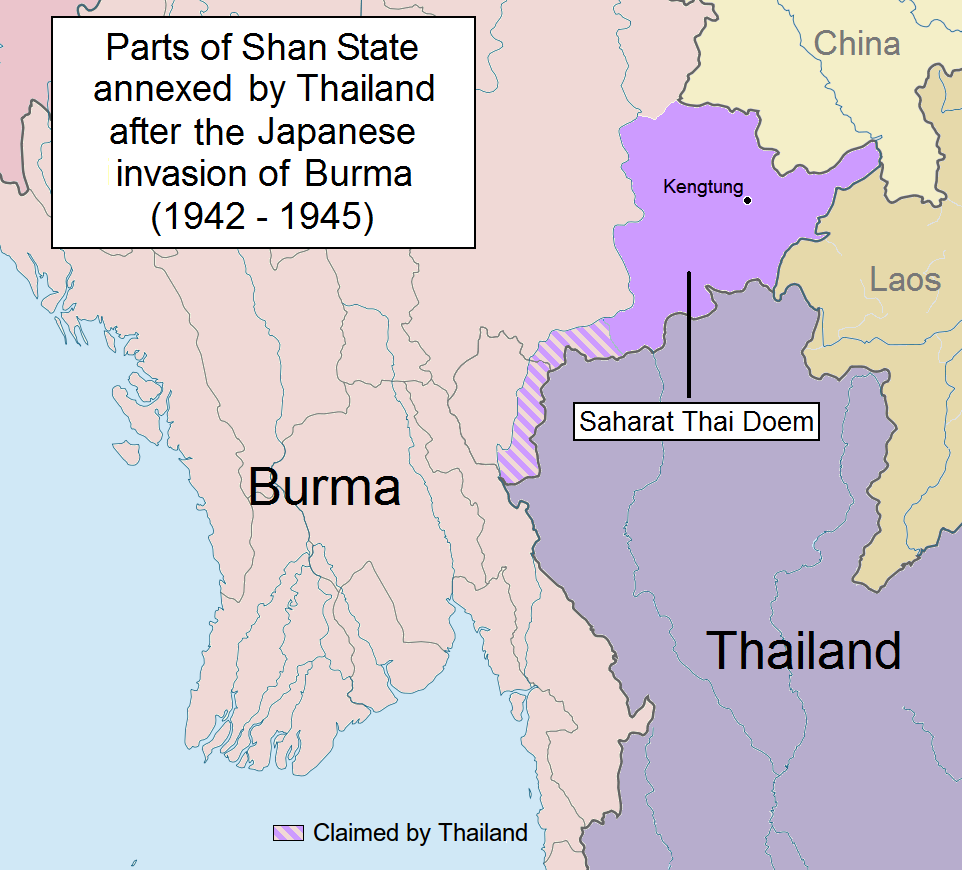
Territories claimed by Thailand in the Shan and Karenni States during WWII.

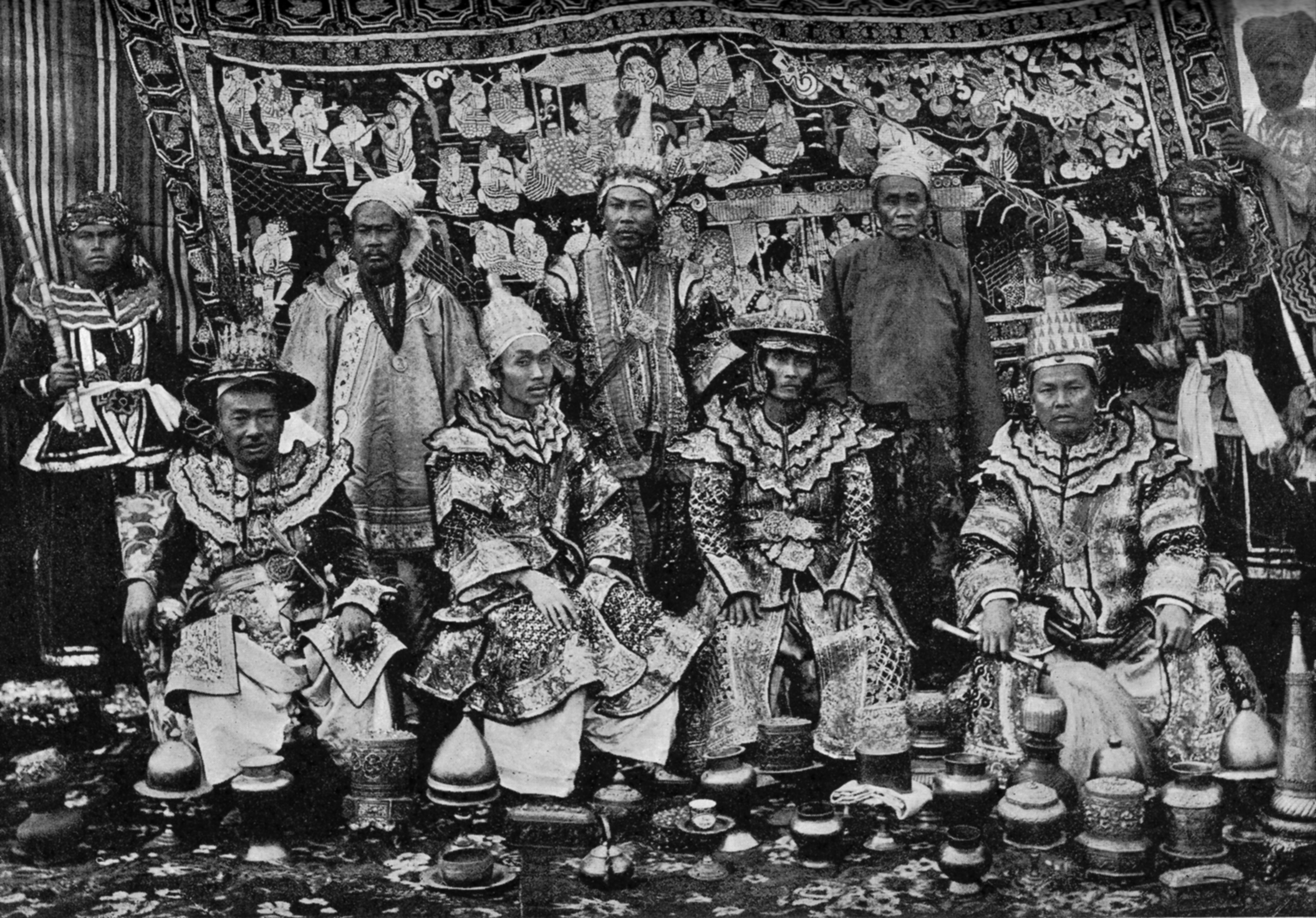
The ruler of Kantarawadi (standing in the middle of the back row), at the Delhi Durbar in 1903

Kantarawadi (Burmese: ကန္ဒရဝတီ; Thai: กันตรวดี), also known as Gantarawadi, was one of the Karenni States in what is today Kayah State in Burma and Mae Hong Son in Thailand. It was also known as "Eastern Karenni" owing to the location of part of its territory east of the Salween River.

== History ==
According to local tradition in the early times of the Karenni states there was a principality led by a "Sawphya" that was similar to Shan State rule. This state finally became independent in the 18th century. In the 19th century the Karenni state was divided into five principalities (sawphyas).

In 1864 a Karenni prince requested the status of British protectorate for his state, but the British authorities did not show any interest. After the death of this prince in 1869 his two sons renewed the petition claiming that they feared Burmese ambitions on their state. The British refused again, but agreed to arbitrate before the King of Burma. Since the Burmese monarchy insisted in their demands on the Karenni territories, the British granted recognition to four states, Kyebogyi, Namekan (Nammekon), Naungpale and Bawlake, which became independent under British protection on 21 June 1875. Kantarawadi state, however, remained independent without official protection. Kantarawadi was heavily fined in 1888 for the disturbances caused by Myoza Sao Law Paw (Sawlapaw). After his successor Sao Lawi agreed to pay a tribute of Rs 5,000 to the British government, he was granted the title of Saopha.

In November the same year the government of Siam tried to establish its territorial rights over the eastern tract of land in Kantarawadi. Following the expedition against the Red Karens in the Karenni area the Anglo-Siamese Boundary Commission of 1892-93 would be set up in order to resolve the disputes about the territory the Siamese had occupied on the eastern side of the Salween as well as the Trans-Salween territories that had been handed over to the Saopha of Mong Pan State to which Siam also laid claim.

In 1942, the Imperial Japanese Army accompanied by the Thai Phayap Army invaded the Federated Shan States from Thailand. The defense of the Shan States had been left to the Nationalist Chinese forces, upon the request of the British. The 93rd Division of the Chinese Army defended the Keng Tung, while the 249th and 55th Divisions guarded from the Kengtung to Karenni States along the Thai border. The Japanese forces with superior air power went on to dislodge the Nationalist Chinese forces by November 1942. The IJA allowed the Phayap Army to occupy all of Kengtung State and the four trans-Salween districts of Möng Tang, Möng Hang, Möng Kyawt and Möng Hta of Mongpan State. Following the existing agreement between Thai Prime Minister Plaek Phibunsongkhram (Phibun) and the Japanese Empire, on 18 August 1943, the Japanese government agreed to the Thai annexation of Kengtung and part of Mongpan state (as well as the annexation of Kelantan, Trengganu, Kedah, Perlis states and nearby islands in Malaya.) The Thai government wanted the two districts of Möngmaü and Mehsakun of Mawkmai of the southern Shan states as well as part of Kantarawadi, all located east of the Salween River, but the Japanese assigned them to their client State of Burma in September 1943.

Following the defeat and surrender of the Japanese Empire, Thailand left the territories it had annexed to the north in 1945. However, the Thai government officially relinquished its claim over Kantarawadi State only in 1946 as part of the condition for admission to the United Nations and the withdrawal of all wartime sanctions for having sided with the Axis powers.

=== Rulers ===
The rulers of Kantarawadi bore the title of Saopha after 1903.

- 1837? Maung Pon (Pe Baw)
- 1845? Papaw Kyi
- 1850? Sao Lasa
- c.1850 - 1866 Sao Pyatin
- 1866 - 1868 Sao Law Paw (d. 1930)

==== Myozas ====
- 1868 - Dec 1888 Sao Law Paw (s.a.)
- 28 Jan 1889 - 3 Jan 1903 Sao Lawi (b. 1852 - d. 1907)

==== Saophas ====
- 1 Jan 1903 - 8 Jul 1907 Sao Lawi (s.a.)
- 2 Dec 1907 - 1909 Hkun Nan (b. 1880 - d. 1909)
- 22 Apr 1910 - c.1948 Hkun Li (b. 1891 - d. 19..)

== See also ==
- Western Karenni
