= Bawlakhe =

Bawlakhe ဘော်လခဲမြို့
- Location in Burma
- Coordinates: 19°10′33″N 97°20′37″E
- Country: Myanmar
- Division: Kayah State
- District: Bawlakhe District
- Township: Bawlakhe Township

Population (2005)
  - Religions: Buddhism
- Time zone: UTC+6.30 (MST)

Bawlakhe (Burmese: ဘော်လခဲမြို့) is a town in the Kayah State of eastern part of Burma.

== History ==
Bawlakhe was originally known as Bawlake.

The British official, James George Scott, wrote that local inhabitants in the 1890s claimed that Poe Bya Hla had ruled as the fifth ruler of the Karenni State of Bawlake. Bawlake was most likely founded during the early wars of the Konbaung Dynasty, perhaps around 1760. Scott suggested it was founded before 1783.

Bawlake then became the capital of Bawlake State, and after the independence of Burma, it was renamed Bawlakhe.
