= Mong Ton District =

Mong Ton Township Mong Ton District မိုင်းတုံမြို့နယ် မိုင်းတုံခရိုင်
- Township and District
- Location in Shan State (in red)
- Coordinates: 20°18′N 98°56′E
- Country: Myanmar
- State: Shan State
- District: Mong Ton District
- Capital: Mong Ton

Area
  - Total: 2,522.29 sq mi (6,532.7 km^{2})
- Elevation: 1,648 ft (502 m)

Population (2023)
  - Total: 69,709
  - Density: 27.637/sq mi (10.671/km^{2})
  - Ethnicities: Wa; Lahu; Shan; Kokang; Lisu
  - Religions: Buddhism; Burmese folk religion
- Time zone: UTC+6:30 (MMT)

Mong Ton Township (Burmese: မိုင်းတုံမြို့နယ်) is the only township in Mong Ton District (Burmese: မိုင်းတုံခရိုင်) and is the westernmost part of Eastern Shan State in Myanmar. The capital town is Mong Ton. It borders are Mong Pying Township to the north, Mong Hsat Township to the east, Mong Nai Township and Mong Pan Township to the west and Thailand to the south. Loi Hkilek mountain is located in the area.

The township has three towns- the principal town of Mong Ton as well as Ponparkyin and Mong Hta which have a total of 11 urban wards. The township also has 114 villages grouped into 16 village tracts. The township also includes Ponpaykyin Subtownship and Mong Hta Subtownship, unofficial divisions of the township used for administrative and statistical purposes.

== Recent history ==
Given its location near the border with Thailand and internal conflict, the Burmese army has the important IB277 military base just outside the main town. There are five Burmese army battalions in Mong Ton town alone. Trafficking of narcotics is a major problem in Mong Ton and Burma is the number two opium producer in the world after Afghanistan, and one of the leading producers of amphetamines in South East Asia. The Free Burma Rangers have alleged that the army is involved in the production and trafficking of narcotics in order to profit from the trade in opium, heroin and amphetamines. Opium is cultivated and it is not only processed for trade abroad it is also consumed by some local villagers and has created drug addiction problems.

Mong Ton has had a turbulent and unstable history, with conflicts between the Shan State Army-South (SSA-S) and the Burmese Army, although the problem is worse in the Kyethi, Mong Kung, and Laihka Townships. In Mong Ton and Mong Hsat Township, the SPDC has demanded the removal of some UWSA military outposts and the Burmese Army is exerting more pressure on Lahu militias to conscript more soldiers and prepare to fight both the SSA–S and the UWSA. The SPDC supported three basic military training courses for the Lahu militia in Mong Ton during 2009.

The plurality of inhabitants of the Township are Wa people, making up 48% of residents. The second largest group are the Lahu people at 22%. Portions of the township are part of the de facto southern area of Wa State, by the United Wa State Army's Fourth Theater Command as the "171st military region" and enjoys a high degree of local autonomy. For example, the it was allowed to implement its own COVID-19 policies.

In 2022, the Ministry of Home Affairs promoted to its own district, splitting the township from Mong Hsat District.
