= Mong Hsat =

Mong Hsat ဝဵင်းမိူင်းသၢတ်ႇ မိုင်းဆတ်မြို့
- Town
- Location in Myanmar
- Coordinates: 20°32′N 99°15′E
- Country: Myanmar
- Region: Shan State
- District: Mong Hsat District
- Township: Mong Hsat Township
- Time zone: UTC+6.30 (MST)

Mong Hsat (Burmese: မိုင်းဆတ်မြို့, MLCTS: muing.chat.mrui) is a town in the Shan State of Myanmar, the capital of Mong Hsat Township. It is served by Monghsat Airport.

== History ==
Monghsat State (Mönghsat, where Mong is equivalent to Thai Mueang) was one of the Shan States. It was a tributary state of Kengtung State. The capital was the town of Monghsat.

In the 1950s, the Republic of China Armed Forces controlled the town, and tried to build the town as a base to counterattack against mainland China which was taken over by the Chinese Communist Party to establish People's Republic of China before then.

Cultivation of the opium poppy is said to be on the rise in the area after the United Wa State Army decided to stop it in their territory of northern Shan state, in the 2000s.

== Climate ==
Climate data for Mong Hsat, elevation 572 m (1,877 ft), (1981–2010)
Month	Jan	Feb	Mar	Apr	May	Jun	Jul	Aug	Sep	Oct	Nov	Dec	Year
Record high °C (°F)	32.1 (89.8)	34.6 (94.3)	37.1 (98.8)	39.1 (102.4)	39.5 (103.1)	36.9 (98.4)	35.5 (95.9)	35.1 (95.2)	34.5 (94.1)	35.2 (95.4)	33.8 (92.8)	31.3 (88.3)	39.5 (103.1)
Mean daily maximum °C (°F)	28.0 (82.4)	30.2 (86.4)	33.1 (91.6)	34.8 (94.6)	32.7 (90.9)	30.7 (87.3)	29.5 (85.1)	29.7 (85.5)	30.7 (87.3)	30.7 (87.3)	28.8 (83.8)	27.1 (80.8)	30.5 (86.9)
Mean daily minimum °C (°F)	10.4 (50.7)	9.8 (49.6)	12.5 (54.5)	17.4 (63.3)	21.2 (70.2)	22.6 (72.7)	22.5 (72.5)	22.3 (72.1)	21.8 (71.2)	20.2 (68.4)	16.2 (61.2)	12.3 (54.1)	17.4 (63.3)
Record low °C (°F)	3.8 (38.8)	4.3 (39.7)	7.3 (45.1)	12.4 (54.3)	16.7 (62.1)	20.7 (69.3)	20.5 (68.9)	20.4 (68.7)	17.3 (63.1)	11.9 (53.4)	7.5 (45.5)	4.7 (40.5)	3.8 (38.8)
Average rainfall mm (inches)	3.2 (0.13)	4.7 (0.19)	7.1 (0.28)	41.9 (1.65)	168.4 (6.63)	163.6 (6.44)	158.1 (6.22)	253.2 (9.97)	293.4 (11.55)	184.0 (7.24)	60.6 (2.39)	8.1 (0.32)	1,346.3 (53.00)
Source: Norwegian Meteorological Institute
