= Free Burma Rangers =

Burmese humanitarian organization

Free Burma Rangers (FBR; Burmese: ဖရီးဘားမားရိန်းဂျား) is a Christian multinational humanitarian aid and advocacy organization. It was founded in 1997 by David Eubank in response to the humanitarian crisis arising from the ongoing Myanmar Civil War. They operate in Myanmar, Sudan, Iraq and Syria delivering emergency medical assistance to sick and injured internally displaced people (IDPs): in an effort to alleviate the long-running campaign of violence by the military junta, the State Peace and Development Council, against Myanmar's ethnic minorities.

FBR trains teams of men and women in front-line medical treatment and reconnaissance techniques. In addition to delivering humanitarian relief, a secondary role of the teams is to obtain evidence of military violence and human rights abuse. This information is then published in the form of online reports and/or released to larger international human rights groups, inter-governmental organizations such as the UN, and news agencies.

FBR is one of a number of grassroots organizations that have emerged in response to the growing health needs of Myanmar’s persecuted ethnic underclass. FBR is not supported by either the Thai or Burmese authorities and their activity inside the Burmese border is clandestine.

== Mission statement ==
To bring help, hope and love to people of all faiths and ethnicities in the conflict areas, to shine a light on the actions of oppressors, to stand with the oppressed and support leaders and organizations committed to liberty, justice and service.

— FreeBurmaRangers.org

== History ==
FBR was formed in the late 1990s following an escalation of Burmese military activity against the Karen people. Villages were destroyed, people killed and more than 100,000 people forced from their homes in a program of violence that was designed to remove people from land to make way for developing business interests.

The history, character and ongoing activity of the Rangers is closely linked to its American founder Dave Eubank, who assumed the Karen pseudonym Tha-U-Wah-A-Pah ("TUWAP"). He is a Fuller Theological Seminary-educated pastor and ex-member of the U.S. Special Forces. Having already spent a number of years as a missionary in Myanmar, in 1996, following a chance meeting with Aung San Suu Kyi, the leader of the National League for Democracy, TUWAP was inspired to initiate a ‘Global Day of Prayer’ and help to strengthen unity between the majority Burmese population and the various minority ethnic groups. TUWAP was then in Myanmar during the Army Offensives of 1997, distributing medicine to those displaced by the conflict, and it was during this time that he decided to employ his broad mixture of skills to bring a unique brand of humanitarian relief to a greater number.

In the words of the FBR leader, “[The situation in Burma] is a slow, creeping cancer, in which the regime is working to dominate, control, and radically assimilate all the ethnic peoples of the country.”

In January 2013, footage obtained by the Free Burma Rangers and released to the world's media was instrumental in stopping continued Burmese military offensives against the Kachin Independence Army in the north of Myanmar.

At least one FBR team was present at the liberation of Mosul, Iraq, in 2017.

FBR is a Christian organization. "The purpose of the Free Burma Rangers is to share the love of Jesus and to be His Ambassadors wherever we go," states Eubank on the FBR website.

== FBR teams ==
Every year about 15 multi-ethnic teams, including representatives from the Karen, Karenni, Shan, Arakan, Kachin and other ethnic groups complete the intensive Ranger training. The training program is delivered with the help of other specialist organisations, including the Mae Tao Clinic and covers a diverse and comprehensive mix of practical relief, survival skills and socio-political awareness, including:

- ethnic issues
- ethics
- conflict resolution
- public health
- first aid
- advanced medical and basic dental care
- human rights interviewing and documentation
- reporting
- counselling

Break down of full-time relief teams by ethnic origin

- Arakan 10 teams
- Kachin 8 teams
- Karen 28 teams
- Karenni 5 teams
- Lahu 2 team
- Shan 4 teams
- Pa-Oh 2 teams
- Nagaland 2 teams
- Chin 2 teams
- Mon 3 teams
- ABSDF 1 team
- Ta'ang 6 teams
- HQ's 2 teams

Overview of FBR relief operations since 1997

Total teams trained: 300

Relief missions conducted: over 1,000

Patients treated: over 550,000

People helped: over 1,500,000

== Fields of operation ==
FBR teams operate in conflict zones other than Burma, such as the conflict involving ISIS in Syria and Iraq.

== Free Burma Rangers and Rambo ==
The film Rambo was released worldwide in early 2008, with Sylvester Stallone continuing his role as the eponymous hero. In it, a fictionalised Burmese military played the role of the 'evil oppressors' and, although the film didn't reach Burmese cinema screens, it became a huge underground success amongst the Burmese population. Research for the movie was obtained, in large part, from FBR field reports.

== Gallery ==
FBR
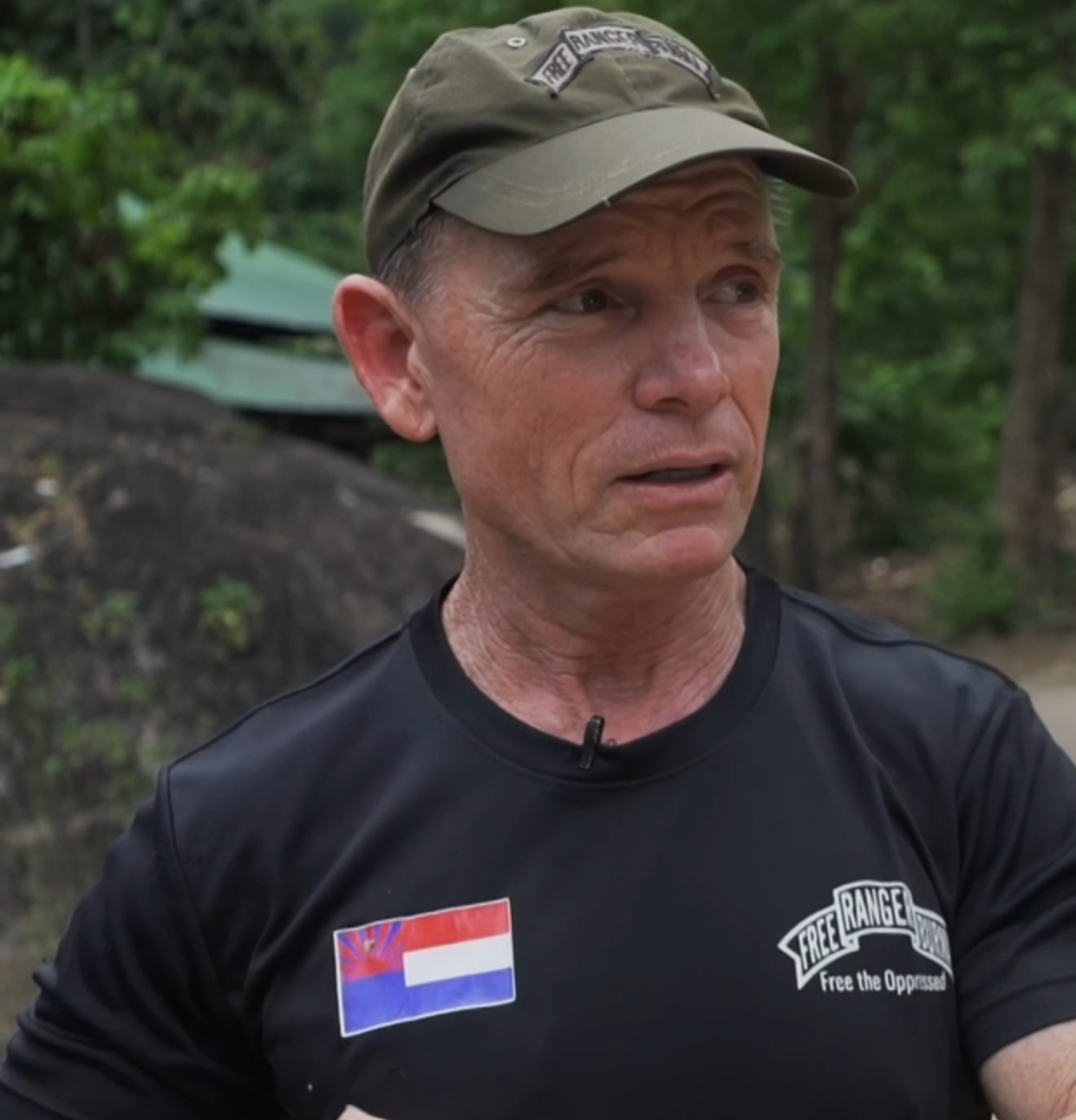
David Eubank during a VOA interview

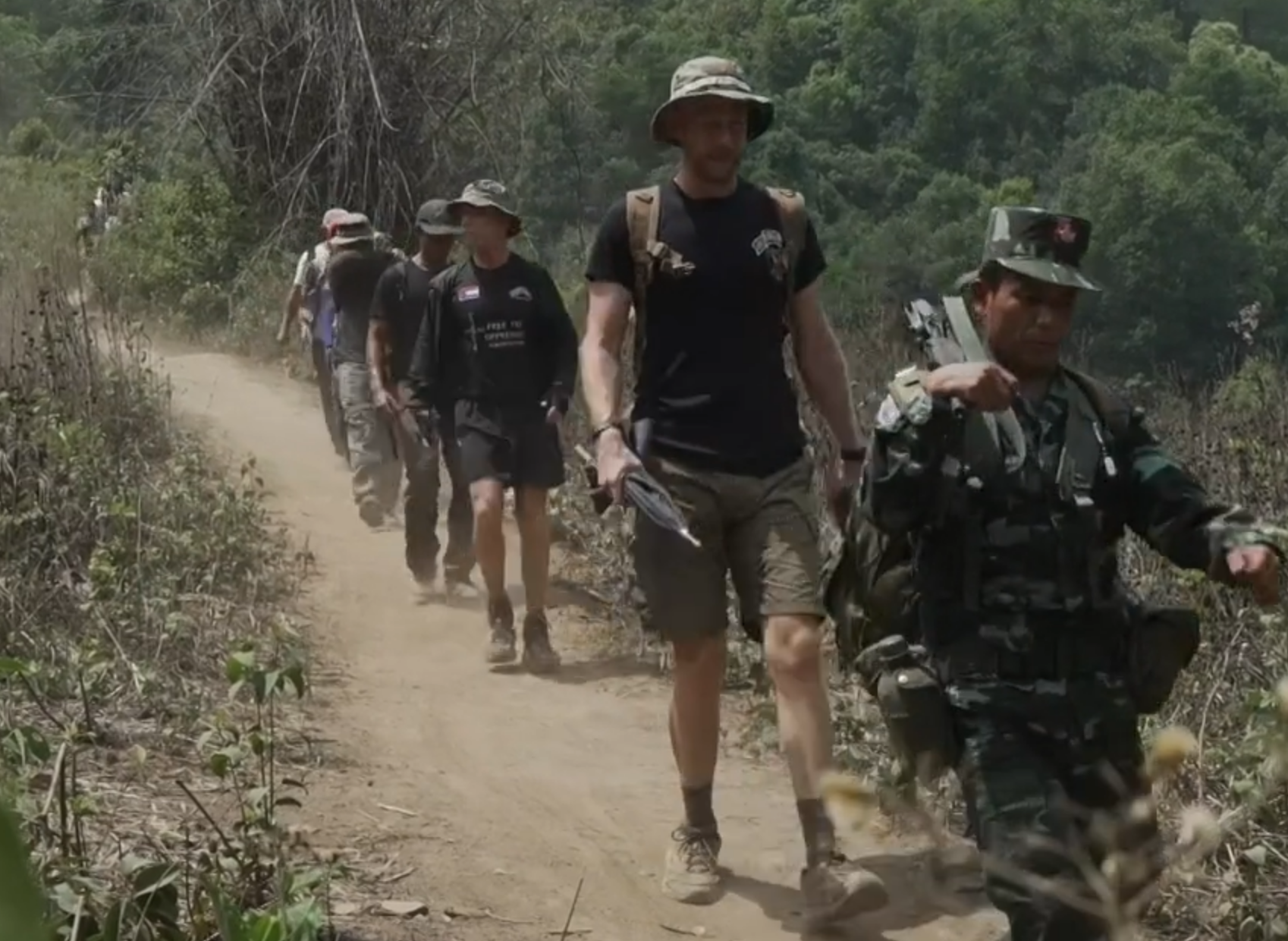
Free Burma Rangers with the KNLA

== See also ==
- Burma Campaign UK
