= Mong Hsat Township =

Mong Hsat မိုင်းဆတ်မြို့နယ်
- Township
- Location in Shan State (in red)
- Coordinates: 20°32′00″N 99°15′00″E
- Country: Myanmar
- State: Shan
- District: Mong Hsat District
- Capital: Mong Hsat
- Elevation: 598 m (1,962 ft)
- Time zone: UTC+6.30 (MST)

Mong Hsat Township is a township of Mong Hsat District in the Shan State of Myanmar. The capital town is Mong Hsat.

== See also ==
- Saharat Thai Doem
