= Mong Pan =

Town in Southern Shan State, Myanmar

Mong Pan မိူင်းပၼ်ႇ မိုင်းပန်
- Town
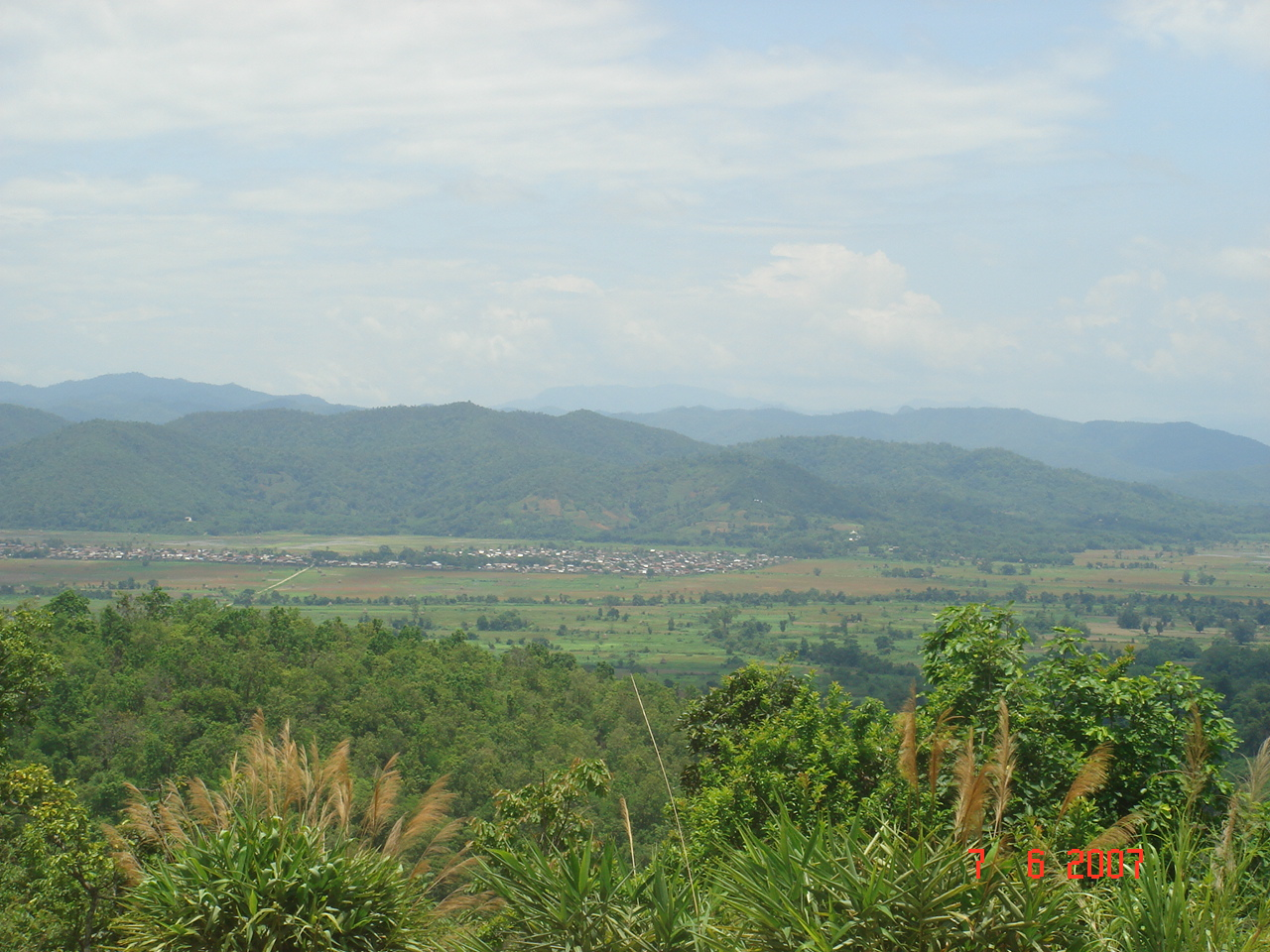

- Location in Burma
- Coordinates: 20°19′10″N 98°21′45″E
- Country: Burma
- State: Shan
- District: Langkho District
- Township: Mong Pan Township
- Elevation: 815 m (2,674 ft)
- Time zone: UTC+6.30 (MST)

Mong Pan (Shan: ဝဵင်းမိူင်းပၼ်ႇ) is a town and seat of Mong Pan Township in the southern Shan State of Myanmar (Burma). To the south it borders Mae Hong Son Province in Thailand and lies west of the Salween River. It lies along National Road 45.

== Etymology ==
The name "Mong Pan" means "town of the revolving [lotus]" in Shan, and is transliterated into Burmese as Maingpan, also spelt Mine Pan.

== History ==
This town was formerly the residence of the Sawbwa of Mongpan State. The four districts of Möng Tang, Möng Hang, Möng Kyawt and Möng Hta, located to the south on the east bank of the Salween belonged to the Cis-Salween Sawbwa of Möngpan. In 1888 there was trouble owing to the action of Siam, who attempted to take possession of them. Siamese troops were posted in the four districts. Siam also claimed a further district, Möng Hsat, but posted no troops there.
