= Ponparkyin =

Town in Eastern Shan State, Myanmar

Ponparkyin ဝဵင်းပုင်ႇပႃႇၶႅမ် ပုံပါကျင်မြို့
- Town
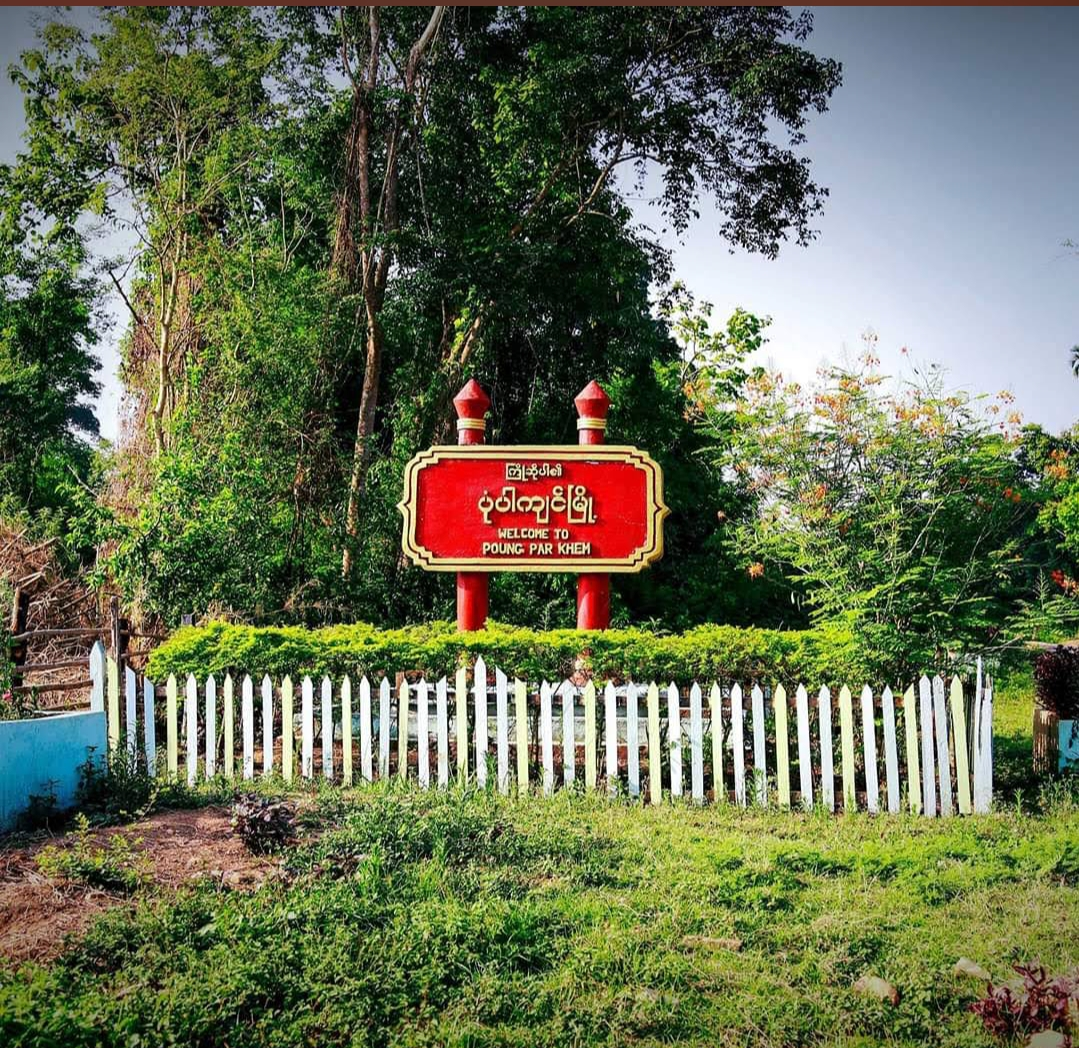

- Location in Myanmar
- Coordinates: 19°53′21″N 98°56′18″E
- Country: Myanmar
- State: Shan State
- District: Mong Ton District
- Township: Mong Ton Township

Population (2014)
  - Town: 43,816
  - Urban: 3,201
  - Rural: 40,618
- Time zone: UTC+6.30 (MST)

Ponparkyin is a small town near the Myanmar-Thailand border in Mong Ton District of Shan State in eastern Myanmar. Really, It is Known as " Poung Par Khem " by Shan People.
