= Mong Hsat District =

Mong Hsat District မိုင်းဆတ်ခရိုင်
- District
- Coordinates: 20°50′N 99°6′E
- Country: Myanmar
- State: Shan State
- Capital: Mong Hsat
- Elevation: 598 m (1,962 ft)
- Time zone: UTC+6.30 (MMT)

Mong Hsat District (Burmese: မိုင်းဆတ်ခရိုင်) is a district of Shan State in Myanmar. It only contains one township- Mong Hsat Township. The capital of the district is Mong Hsat.

== Townships ==
The district contains the following townships:

- Mong Hsat Township
  - Mong Khoke Subtownship

Prior to 2022, it consisted of 2 townships. In April 2022, the Ministry of Home Affairs split off Mong Ton Township to form the new Mong Ton District, leaving the District with only Mong Hsat Township.

Mong Ping Township was moved under Kengtung District.
