= Nansang =

Town in Shan State, Myanmar

Namsang ဝဵင်းၼမ်ႉၸၢင် နမ့်စန်မြို့
- Town
- Nan San
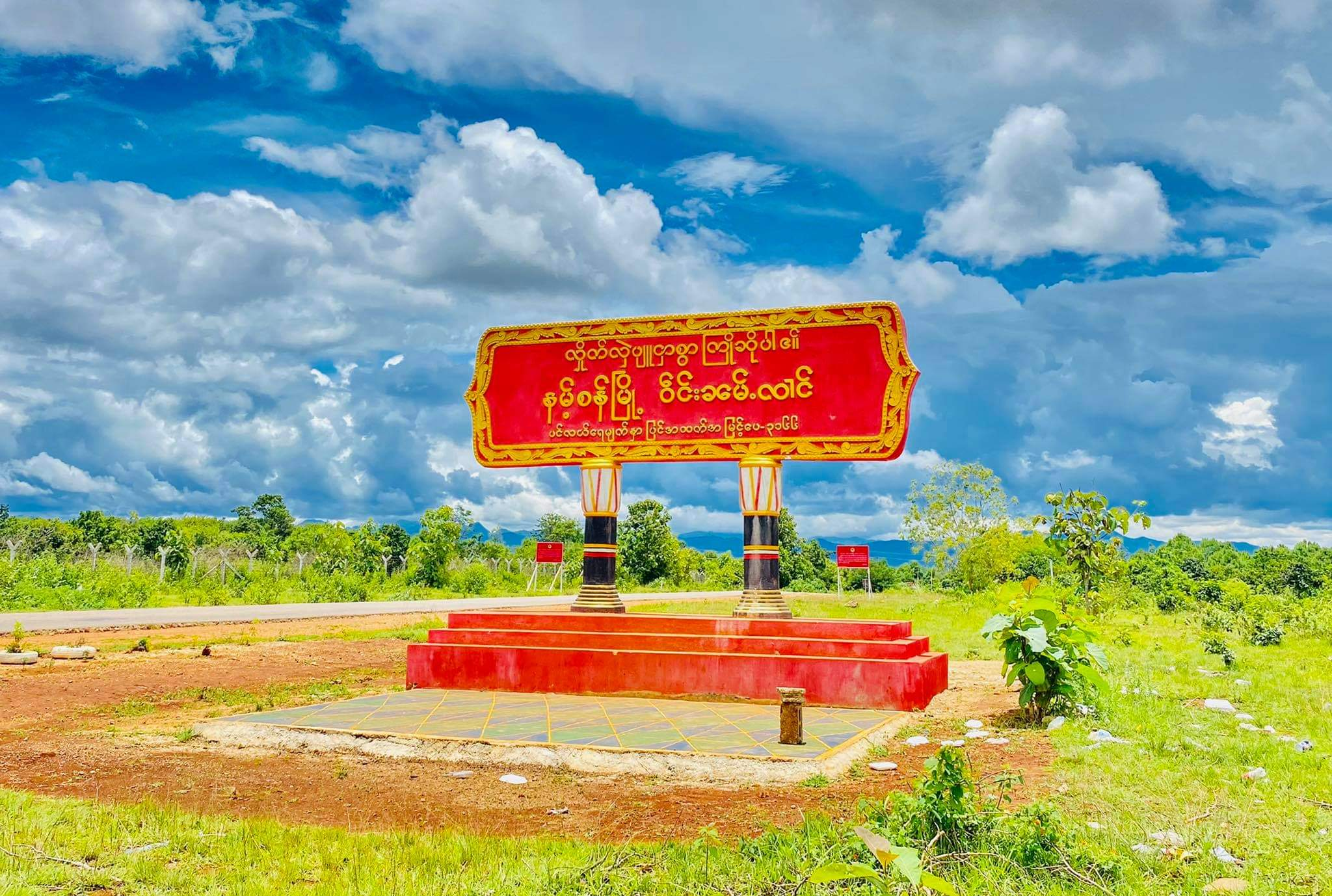
- Sign at entrance of Namsang

- Location in Myanmar
- Coordinates: 20°53′20″N 97°44′10″E
- Country: Myanmar
- State: Shan State
- District: Nansang District
- Township: Nansang Township

Area
  - Total: 1,594.62 sq mi (4,130.0 km^{2})
- Elevation: 3,255 ft (992 m)

Population
  - Total: 26,060
  - Density: 16.34/sq mi (6.310/km^{2})
- Time zone: UTC+6.30 (MMT)
- Area code: 06161

Nansang or Namsang (Shan: ဝဵင်းၼမ်ႉၸၢင်), officially Nan San (Burmese: နမ့်စန်မြို့) is the capital of Nansang District of Shan State in eastern Myanmar. It is the seat of Nansang Township. It is the most populous settlement of the eastern central area of Shan State, with 26,060 people in 2019. Most residents live in Ward 4, the northwest part of the town. It is 72 miles away from Taunggyi. A pagoda lies in the southern part of the town. It is also known as Taung Paw Pagoda.

== Formation of District ==
On April 30, 2022, new districts were established across the country. Namsang and Kunhing Townships from Loilem District and Mong Nai Township from Langkho District were separated to form Namsang District. The townships and towns included in Namsang District are as follows

- Namsang
  - Kholam
- Kunhing
  - KaLi
- Mong Nai
  - Keng Tawng

== Population and Ethnicity ==
Most people are Buddhist. There are nearly thirty Buddhist monasteries. This region has a population of 70,000 people, most of whom are villagers engaged in agriculture. Only 20,000 people live in town. Most people are of Shan ethnicity. There is chauvinism for few people (Burmese, Paoh, Yinn, Ta'ang, Lahu, Lisu, etc).

== Education ==
=== Public School ===
- No(1) Basic Education High School
- No(2) Basic Education High School (Myoma)
- Myo Oo Basic Education Sub High School
- No(5) Basic Education Sub High School
- Air Army Basic Education High School

=== Private School ===
- Pann Pyoe Yadanar Myay Private High School
- Kaung Myat Private High School
- Brightstar Private Basic School
- Pyin Nyar Young Chi Private Basic School

== Health Centers ==
=== Public Health Centers ===
- General Hospital (25 Bedded)
- Army Hospital, 8th MB (100 Bedded)

=== Private Health Centers ===
- Khaing Myittar Hospital
- Cherry Hospital
- Myat Mon Hospital
- Moe Makha Hospital

=== Air Bases ===
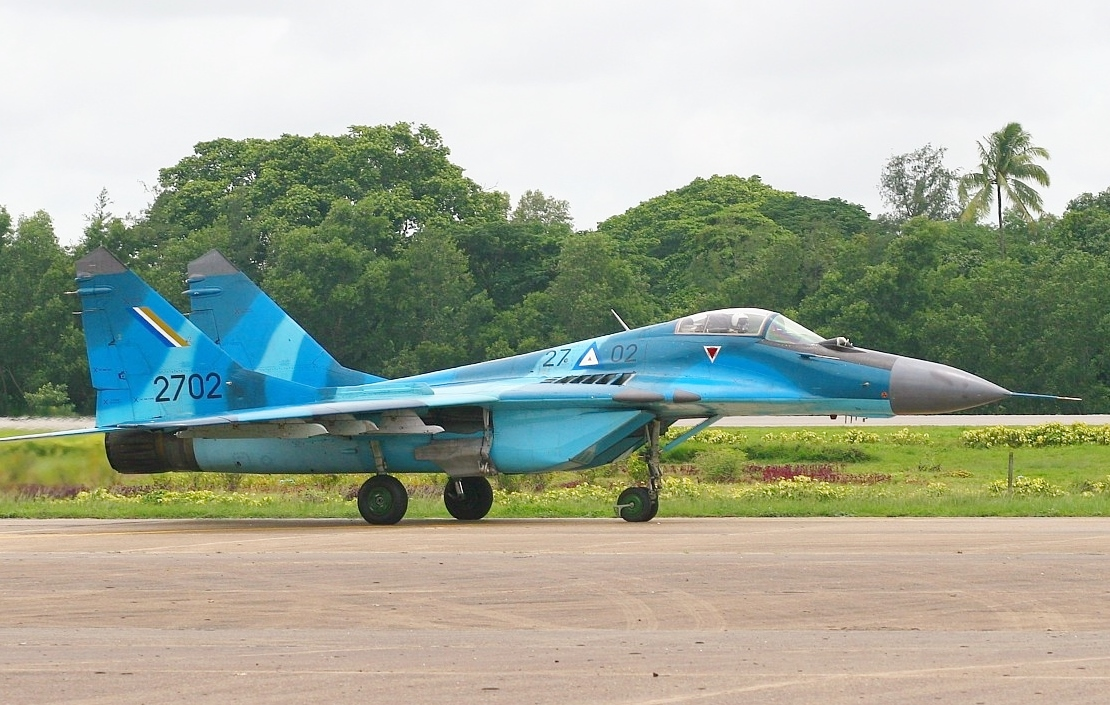
A MiG-29B sits on the tarmac

Myanmar Air Force also utilised civilian airfields as front-line air fields in case of foreign invasion.

- Namsang Air Base
- Namsang Airport

== Climate ==
Namsang has a humid subtropical climate (Köppen climate classification Cwa), closely bordering a subtropical highland climate (Cwb). There is a winter dry season (December–March) and a summer wet-season (April–November). Temperatures are warm throughout the year; the winter months (December–February) are milder but the nights can be quite cool.

Climate data for Namsang (1981–2010, extremes 2001–2010)
Month	Jan	Feb	Mar	Apr	May	Jun	Jul	Aug	Sep	Oct	Nov	Dec	Year
Record high °C (°F)	28.5 (83.3)	30.0 (86.0)	33.0 (91.4)	36.0 (96.8)	35.5 (95.9)	31.5 (88.7)	29.5 (85.1)	29.5 (85.1)	29.5 (85.1)	30.0 (86.0)	29.5 (85.1)	27.5 (81.5)	36.0 (96.8)
Mean daily maximum °C (°F)	23.8 (74.8)	26.0 (78.8)	29.0 (84.2)	30.2 (86.4)	27.7 (81.9)	26.6 (79.9)	26.0 (78.8)	25.5 (77.9)	25.5 (77.9)	25.0 (77.0)	23.5 (74.3)	22.3 (72.1)	25.9 (78.6)
Mean daily minimum °C (°F)	4.2 (39.6)	6.8 (44.2)	10.7 (51.3)	14.0 (57.2)	15.1 (59.2)	16.1 (61.0)	16.2 (61.2)	15.8 (60.4)	14.7 (58.5)	13.0 (55.4)	9.2 (48.6)	5.2 (41.4)	11.8 (53.2)
Record low °C (°F)	−4.0 (24.8)	−2.0 (28.4)	1.0 (33.8)	5.0 (41.0)	8.0 (46.4)	10.0 (50.0)	10.0 (50.0)	10.0 (50.0)	9.0 (48.2)	4.5 (40.1)	−2.0 (28.4)	−4.0 (24.8)	−4.0 (24.8)
Average precipitation mm (inches)	6.5 (0.26)	9.3 (0.37)	12.9 (0.51)	62.3 (2.45)	252.4 (9.94)	418.4 (16.47)	429.9 (16.93)	391.2 (15.40)	262.1 (10.32)	176.1 (6.93)	79.4 (3.13)	13.7 (0.54)	2,114.2 (83.24)
Source: Norwegian Meteorological Institute

== Demographics ==
=== 2014 ===
Historical Population
Year	Pop.	±%
1973		—
1983		—
2014	72,098	—
Source: Ministry of Labor, Immigration, and Population data

The 2014 Myanmar Census reported that Namsang Township had a population of 72,098. The population density was 350.1 people per km².

== See also ==
- Nansang Township
