= Mong Kung Township =

Mong Kung မိုင်းကိုင်မြို့နယ်
- Township
- Location in Loilem district
- Coordinates: 21°36′30″N 97°31′50″E
- Country: Myanmar
- State: Shan State
- District: Loilem District
- Capital: Mong Kung
- Elevation: 1,095 m (3,593 ft)
- Time zone: UTC+6.30 (MST)

Mong Kung Township or Mongkaung Township (Burmese: မိုင်းကိုင်မြို့နယ်) is a township of Loilen District in the Shan State of Burma. The principal town is Mong Kung.

Sometime prior to 2002, the southern portion of Mong Kung Township was transferred to Hopong Township in Taunggyi District.

There are five urban quarters, 348 villages in 24 village tracts with a total population of 61,633 in 2015. 40,571 acres were cultivated for agriculture.

== Towns and Villages ==
- Ang-nu
- Hai Hkai
- Hai-hso
- Hai-kun
- Hai Kwe
- Hamngai
- Hkai-makking
- Hkai-wun
- Hkam-hawng
- Hkamna
- Hki-hkaw
- Hko Hpai Mai
- Hkok Lin
- Hko-lu
- Hko-mit
- Hko Mong
- Hko-ut
- Hko-yep
- Hkumhpok
- Ho Heng
- Ho-hkai (21°59'0"N 97°34'0"E)
- Ho-hkai (21°55'0"N 97°42'0"E)
- Ho-hkai (21°39'0"N 97°47'0"E)
- Ho-hko
- Ho-hpai
- Ho-hpoi
- Ho-löng (21°44'0"N 97°52'0"E)
- Ho Long (21°16'0"N 97°10'0"E)
- Ho-mang
- Ho-nā
- Ho-nā
- Ho-nam
- Ho-nawng
- Hona Yok
- Ho-to
- Hpa-hki
- Hpai-man
- Hpakchem
- Hpa Kēng
- Hpak Hkyem
- Hpakpong
- Hpa-lai
- Hpa-lan
- Hpā-mai
- Hpan Kawk
- Hpa Süi
- Hpa-wan
- Hpawnghsing
- Hpöngmung
- Hputan
- Hpya-ling
- Hsam-pun
- Hsang-hsong
- Hsangka
- Hsang Tai
- Hsa-taw
- Hsawngke
- Hsawng Pun
- Hsaw Taw
- Hsiphseng
- Hsi Song
- Htamlaya
- Htānghkan
- Hti-hpo
- Hti-re
- Htonbong
- Hwè-ham
- Hwe-he
- Hwè-hok
- Hwe-hwe
- Hwè Kot
- Hwe-lok
- Hwè-long
- Hwè-mawng
- Hwè-nio
- Hwè-noi (21°46'0"N 97°33'0"E)
- Hwè-noi (21°45'0"N 97°33'0"E)
- Hwepawn
- Hwè-taw
- Hwè-wa (21°57'0"N 97°47'0"E)
- Hwè-wa (21°43'0"N 97°51'0"E)
- Ka Lu
- Kawnghāk
- Kawnghsai
- Kawnglang
- Kawnglèng
- Kawngmu-tau
- Kawngpwa
- Kēnghkam
- Keng Hkam
- Konghai-ping
- Konghsa (21°55'0"N 97°35'0"E)
- Kong-hsa
- Konghsa (21°41'0"N 97°44'0"E)
- Konghsim
- Kongkaw (21°53'0"N 97°46'0"E)
- Kongkaw (21°44'0"N 97°48'0"E)
- Kongkēng
- Kong King
- Kongkyan
- Kong La
- Konglang (21°53'0"N 97°47'0"E)
- Konglang (21°52'0"N 97°34'0"E)
- Konglang (21°51'0"N 97°34'0"E)
- Kong-loi-htam
- Kong Long
- Kong Lüng
- Kong-mak-heng
- Kongmakmöng
- Kongmawng
- Kongme-an
- Kong-mong (21°46'0"N 97°41'0"E)
- Kongmong (21°43'0"N 97°45'0"E)
- Kong Mong (21°37'0"N 97°29'0"E)
- Kongmöng (21°34'0"N 97°31'0"E)
- Kong Möng (21°11'0"N 97°21'0"E)
- Kongmu
- Kongnim
- Kong Nok
- Köngnyawng (22°2'0"N 97°20'0"E)
- Kongnyawng (21°38'0"N 97°34'0"E)
- Kong Nyawng
- Kongpaw
- Kongsaihsu
- Köng-sam
- Kongtawng
- Kong Ten
- Konlang
- Konmo
- Kon Pao
- Konsa-lai
- Kung Nyawng
- Kungpau
- Kun-hsan
- Kunna (21°58'0"N 97°29'0"E)
- Kunna (21°43'0"N 97°35'0"E)
- Kunna (21°32'0"N 97°31'0"E)
- Kunniu
- Kuntawng
- Kun-weng
- Kuttēng
- Kyauktan
- Kyawk Ngak
- Kyawng-pong
- Kye-daw
- Kyi Taw
- Lai-hsak
- Lakting
- Leng Aka
- Len Mun
- Lenteng
- Li-maw
- Linhsong
- Linlum
- Loi-ham
- Loi-hke
- Loi-hku
- Loi-hkun
- Loi-hsa
- Loi-hsai
- Loi-hsam
- Loi-hsang
- Loi-hun
- Loi-kau
- Loi-lam
- Loi-leng (21°47'0"N 97°30'0"E)
- Loi-leng (21°38'0"N 97°32'0"E)
- Loi-lin
- Loi-mawkhkam
- Loi-ngon (21°50'0"N 97°36'0"E)
- Loi-ngon (21°29'0"N 97°38'0"E)
- Loi-pang
- Loi-paw
- Loi-pütau
- Loi-pwe
- Loi-sīn
- Loi-tawng
- Loi-wēng
- Loi-yai
- Loi-yoimanmaö
- Longhen (21°42'0"N 97°49'0"E)
- Longhēn (21°39'0"N 97°32'0"E)
- Long Hsam
- Long Hsiae
- Longka
- Long-mik
- Longmöng
- Longping
- Longwing
- Lukhpakha
- Lun-pun
- Mākhkinu
- Mak-hpīt
- Makhsan
- Mak-kun-wo
- Maklang
- Mak-mai
- Makman
- Mak Mi
- Mak Mo
- Makmöngkong
- Mak Mong Non
- Mak Pak
- Man Chengnoi
- Mān Hin
- Mān Hkēm
- Mān Hkong
- Mān Hpat
- Mān Hpwi
- Mān Htam
- Mān Htawk
- Mankat
- Man-kup
- Mān Kyawng (21°52'0"N 97°44'0"E)
- Mān Kyawng (21°47'0"N 97°47'0"E)
- Mān Law
- Mān Lawk
- Mān Leng
- Mān Maü
- Mān Nong
- Mān-pang
- Mān Penwen
- Mān Pong
- Mān Sam
- Mān-sawk
- Mawhseng
- Mi-lön
- Möng Hso
- Möng Küng
- Möng Lang (21°39'0"N 97°29'0"E)
- Möng Lang (21°23'0"N 97°21'0"E)
- Möng-lèng
- Mong Lwe
- Möng Yun
- Myawng U
- Nā-hi
- Nā-hkam
- Nā-hkan
- Na-hkau-long
- Nah Ma Na
- Na-hpawk
- Nā Hsam
- Nā Kawk
- Na-keng
- Na King
- Na Leng
- Nā-lip
- Nā-lo
- Nā Mau
- Nam Awn
- Nam-chēm
- Namhen
- Namhkam
- Namhkok
- Nam-hku
- Nam Hpuk
- Namhu (21°42'0"N 97°39'0"E)
- Namhu (21°32'0"N 97°41'0"E)
- Namhu (21°29'0"N 97°35'0"E)
- Namhu (20°54'0"N 97°18'0"E)
- Namkat
- Nam Kin
- Nam-kom
- Namkong
- Nam Mak Lawt
- Nammawhsamhkan
- Nam Maw Hsing
- Nam Maw Hsum
- Nammawleng
- Nam Maw Lik
- Nammawsing
- Namngo
- Namnip
- Nampa-chi
- Nam Pā-ki
- Nam Pa Lan
- Nampangmöng
- Nampa-sat
- Nam Pon
- Nampong (21°46'0"N 97°39'0"E)
- Nampong (21°40'0"N 97°33'0"E)
- Namsang
- Namsa-pai
- Namtau
- Namtawng
- Nam-un (21°54'0"N 97°46'0"E)
- Nam-un (21°48'0"N 97°46'0"E)
- Nā Mun
- Nam-yang
- Nam-ya-yum
- Na-new
- Na-nging
- Na Nio
- Na-noi
- Nan Wen
- Nā-pong
- Na-pong (21°48'0"N 97°13'0"E)
- Nā-pong (21°44'0"N 97°51'0"E)
- Nā-pong (21°15'0"N 97°6'0"E)
- Nā Tat
- Nā Tawng
- Natawng Hsit
- Nā-ti
- Na-tit
- Nā-un
- Nā Wen
- Nawnghai
- Nawnghkam
- Nawng-hkam
- Nawnghkio (22°2'0"N 97°29'0"E)
- Nawnghkio (21°27'0"N 97°29'0"E)
- Nawng Hko Hkam
- Nawnghpa
- Nawng Hpeik
- Nawng Hsong
- Nawng Hwi (21°28'0"N 97°27'0"E)
- Nawng Hwi (21°27'0"N 97°27'0"E)
- Nawngkai
- Nawngla-yaw
- Nawng Leng (21°57'0"N 97°32'0"E)
- Nawng Leng (21°5'0"N 97°11'0"E)
- Nawng Lio
- Nawngmun (21°49'0"N 97°39'0"E)
- Nawngmun (21°36'0"N 97°29'0"E)
- Nawng-naūn
- Nawng Pa Kin
- Nawngpa-lam
- Nawngsamhpo
- Nawngtaw
- Nawngwek
- Nawngwo
- Nawngya Hsai
- Nawng-yun
- Naw-nya
- Nā-yok
- Neng-hkio
- Ngammöng
- Nwè-hsem
- Nyawng Kwai
- Nyawng Tawk
- Nyawngwing
- Ong Pao
- Ongsang
- Pā-hpai
- Paknam
- Pa-la
- Pa-mawng
- Pa-möng
- Pangbo
- Pang Hkan
- Panghpit
- Panghsa
- Pānghsak
- Pang Hsan
- Pang Hsang
- Pāng-kat
- Pāngkaw
- Pang Kawn
- Pangke-tu
- Pangko
- Pangkot
- Pangkunlong
- Pāngkyehtu
- Panglaw
- Pang-lawn
- Pangling
- Panglong (21°45'0"N 97°39'0"E)
- Pānglong (21°15'0"N 97°12'0"E)
- Pangmaileng
- Pangme-leng
- Pangmong
- Pāngngu
- Pangnim
- Pangniu (21°56'0"N 97°30'0"E)
- Pangniu (21°45'0"N 97°42'0"E)
- Pāngpaw
- Pangsamhkam
- Pāngti
- Pang Tit-tiau
- Pang Yam
- Pa-pan
- Patayap
- Pawhpoi
- Ponghin
- Pongya Hsai
- Pongyam
- Pun-wun
- Sang-īp
- Sanglaw
- Sanglik
- Ta-da-ho-na
- Tai-na
- Taklèt
- Tā-long
- Tan Hping
- Tāpè
- Taung Paw
- Taüwoleng
- Tawmok
- Taw Mun
- Tawng
- Tawnglum
- Tawng-san
- Tawn Hsan
- Taw-sengka
- Tēngkyap
- Teng Leng
- Tenkal
- Teü-hai
- Tib-yu
- Ti-lon
- To-leng
- Tonglau
- Tonglong
- Tung-awn
- Tüngmun
- Tunmöng
- Wan He
- Wan Hkai (21°42'0"N 97°35'0"E)
- Wān Hkai (21°26'0"N 97°28'0"E)
- Wān Hkai-yam
- Wān Hkam
- Wān Hko-hin
- Wān-hkun
- Wān Ho-kwe (21°36'0"N 97°21'0"E)
- Wān Ho-kwe (21°36'0"N 97°19'0"E)
- Wan Ho-nā-mak-ik
- Wān Hpa-hkau
- Wān Hpakki
- Wān Hpakkom
- Wān Hpa-lang
- Wān Hpa-leng
- Wān Hpa-tang
- Wān Hpawnghseng
- Wan Hsai-leng (21°31'0"N 97°18'0"E)
- Wān Hsai Leng (21°12'0"N 97°7'0"E)
- Wān Hsa-lawng
- Wān Hsanha
- Wān Hsawngkut
- Wān Hsi-kap
- Wān Htam (21°55'0"N 97°14'0"E)
- Wān Htam (21°38'0"N 97°19'0"E)
- Wān Hwe (21°38'0"N 97°47'0"E)
- Wān Hwè (21°36'0"N 97°33'0"E)
- Wān Hwè-hsim
- Wān Hwè-loi
- Wān Hwè Lwat
- Wān Hwè-tang
- Wān Ka-hawk
- Wan Ka-hpeuk
- Wān Kan
- Wān Kan Awt
- Wān Kāp
- Wān Kat (21°56'0"N 97°22'0"E)
- Wan Kat (21°27'0"N 97°21'0"E)
- Wan-kawk
- Wān Kawng
- Wān-kawng-mu
- Wān Ke-man
- Wān Kenghkam (21°52'0"N 97°22'0"E)
- Wān Kenghkam (21°34'0"N 97°17'0"E)
- Wan Kengkam
- Wān Kengkawm
- Wān Kengtawng
- Wān Kong (21°37'0"N 97°18'0"E)
- Wān Kong (21°9'0"N 97°18'0"E)
- Wan Konghsa
- Wān Kongkaw
- Wān Kongkeng
- Wan Konglang
- Wān Köngnö-hpoi
- Wān Kongpau
- Wān Kun
- Wan Kwan Kaw
- Wān Kyawng (21°56'0"N 97°47'0"E)
- Wān Kyawng
- Wān Kyawng (21°7'0"N 97°9'0"E)
- Wān Kyong
- Wān Lakawn
- Wān Laklong
- Wan Loi (21°39'0"N 97°43'0"E)
- Wān Loi (21°34'0"N 97°35'0"E)
- Wan Loi (21°4'0"N 97°9'0"E)
- Wān Loi (21°3'0"N 97°19'0"E)
- Wān Loi Hkam
- Wān Loi-hkung
- Wan Loi-kong
- Wān Loi-mong
- Wān Loi-namtau
- Wān Loi-weng
- Wān Lokpa (21°40'0"N 97°14'0"E)
- Wān Lokpa (21°39'0"N 97°14'0"E)
- Wān Long (21°52'0"N 97°40'0"E)
- Wān-long (21°38'0"N 97°36'0"E)
- Wān Long-aungsaw
- Wān Long Hsa La
- Wān Longlan
- Wan Longyon
- Wān Lukkang
- Wān Lwè
- Wān Mai (21°41'0"N 97°47'0"E)
- Wān Mai (21°10'0"N 97°11'0"E)
- Wān Mak
- Wān Mak
- Wān Makhok
- Wān Makhsan
- Wan Mak Ka
- Wān Mak Lang
- Wān Mak Leng
- Wān Makmun
- Wān Manghsu-ling
- Wān Maü (21°43'0"N 97°18'0"E)
- Wān Mau (21°9'0"N 97°17'0"E)
- Wān Maü (21°9'0"N 97°10'0"E)
- Wan Mau (21°4'0"N 97°12'0"E)
- Wān Maw
- Wān Me-pu
- Wān Me-songlaw
- Wān Ming Ak
- Wān Möng (21°50'0"N 97°46'0"E)
- Wān Möng (21°36'0"N 97°44'0"E)
- Wān Nā
- Wan Na-hi
- Wān Na-hpeit
- Wān Nā-keng (21°57'0"N 97°17'0"E)
- Wān Nā-keng (21°37'0"N 97°16'0"E)
- Wān Nā King
- Wān Nā-kong
- Wān Nā-lèk
- Wan Na-lin
- Wān Namhkai
- Wān Namhkai
- Wan Namhkawng
- Wan Namhkon
- Wān Nam Hkot
- Wān Namhu-mawng
- Wān Namküng
- Wān Nammaw
- Wan Nammawhsim
- Wān Nammawhson
- Wān Nammawlong
- Wān Nammawping
- Wān Nā-mong
- Wan Nā-mun
- Wān Na-ong (21°54'0"N 97°21'0"E)
- Wan Nā Ong (21°16'0"N 97°2'0"E)
- Wān Napin
- Wān Nā-ping
- Wān Nā-sam
- Wān Nā-tat
- Wān Nawnghio
- Wan Nawng Hpat
- Wan Nawng King
- Wan Nawngkot
- Wan Nawngmo
- Wan Nawngpa-yem
- Wan Nawngya-hsai
- Wān Ngai
- Wān Pahka (21°50'0"N 97°21'0"E)
- Wān Pahka (21°45'0"N 97°27'0"E)
- Wān Pa-hkaw
- Wan Pa-mawng
- Wan Pa-men
- Wān Pang
- Wān Pangpaw-ye
- Wān Pangpoi
- Wan Pang-yang
- Wānpa Sak
- Wān Pa Taung
- Wān Pāw
- Wān Pawng
- Wān Pa-yang
- Wān-pēk
- Wān Pek-yai
- Wān Pöng (21°33'0"N 97°35'0"E)
- Wān Pong (21°10'0"N 97°10'0"E)
- Wān Pongyawng
- Wān Pyi-yi
- Wān Sam
- Wan Sangleik
- Wān Se
- Wan Tai
- Wān Ta Mai
- Wān Tam Ngong
- Wān Tamngong
- Wān Tan
- Wan Tawng
- Wān Tawngkaw
- Wan Teung
- Wān Yat
- Wèng-leng
- Wen Long
- Yanghkam
- Yangloi
- Yang Yong
- Ya-nio
- Yein Leng
- Ye-pyu
- Ying-nāng
- Ywa Tawng Kaw
