= Kenghkam =

Former Shan State in Burma

Coordinates: 21°52′0″N 97°22′0″E

- State of the Shan States
- 1811–1882
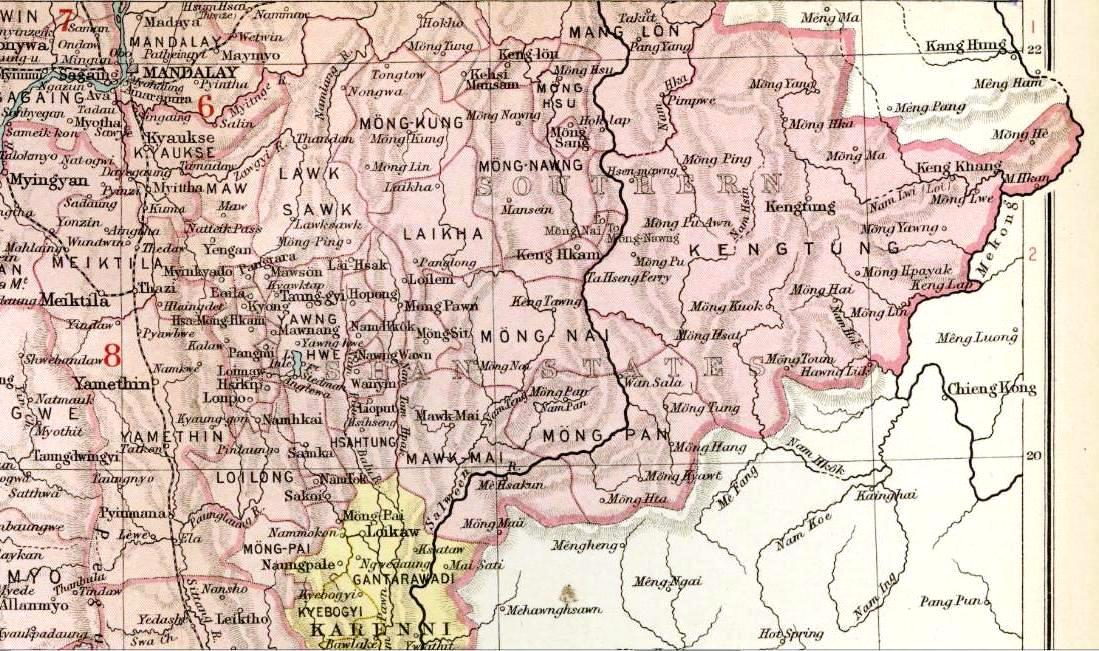
- Keng Hkam in an Imperial Gazetteer of India map
- Capital: Keng Hkam
- Area
  - 1901: 432.5 km^{2} (167.0 sq mi)
- Population
  - 1901: 5,458
- History
  - State founded: 1811
  - Annexed by Möng Nai: 1882
Preceded by	Succeeded by
Konbaung dynasty	Möng Nai

Kenghkam or Keng Hkam (also known as Kyaingkan) was a Shan state in what is today Burma. The capital was the town of Keng Hkam, located by the Nam Pang River.

== History ==
Kenghkam was initially a tributary of the Konbaung dynasty. It was founded in 1811 and was located north of the sub-state of Kengtawng. The state was occupied by Möng Nai from 1870 to 1874 and again from 1878 to 1882, when it was annexed directly.

=== Rulers ===
The rulers of the state bore the title Myoza.

- 1811 – 1854 Bodaw Sao Hkam Yi
- 1855 – 1864 Sao Hkun Mwe
- 1864 – 1870 Naw Hkam Leng
- 1870 – 1870 incorporated into Möngnai
- 1874 – 1878 Sao Hkun Long
- 1878 – 1882 incorporated into Möngnai
- 1882 – c.1889 Sao Naw Süng
- c.1889 – 1905 Hkun Un (b. 18.. - d. 1905)
- 1905 – 19.. Hkun Nawng Hkam (b. 1891 - d. 19..)
- 1905 – 1914? Sao Nang Tip Htila (f) -Regent

== See also ==
- Tip Htila
