= Mong Kung =

Mong Kung မိူင်းၵိုင် မိုင်းကိုင်
- Town
- Location in Burma
- Coordinates: 21°36′30″N 97°31′50″E
- Country: Burma
- State: Shan State
- District: Loilen District
- Township: Mong Kung Township
- Elevation: 1,095 m (3,593 ft)
- Time zone: UTC+6.30 (MST)

Mong Kung, Mongkung, Mongkaung or Möngkung (Burmese: မိုင်းကိုင်; Shan: မိူင်းၵိုင်) is a town in Shan State some 100 kilometres (62 mi) east of Mandalay. It is the capital of Mong Kung Township, Myanmar.

== Etymology ==
The name "Mong Kung" means "town producing horse saddlery" in Shan, and has been transliterated into Burmese as Maingkaing.

== History ==
During British Burma, Mong Kung was the capital of Mongkung State of the Southern Shan States, with an area of 1,642 square miles (4,250 km^{2}). It was bounded on the north by Hsi Paw; on the east by Mong Tung, Kehsi Mansam and Mong Nawng; on the south by Lai Hka; and on the west by the western range of the Shan Hills and Lawk Sawk.

Mong Kung has had a turbulent and unstable history. It was described by Sir Charles Haukes Todd during the colonial period as: ...a State blessed with very fertile soil and good streams. But here also local dissension and Burman interference had brought ruin.

In the popular Shan folktale Khun San Law and Nan Oo Pyin, Mong Kung is the hometown of the female character, Nan Oo Pyin.

More recently the area has been ravaged by conflicts between the Shan State Army-South (SSA-S) and the Burmese Army.
