= Kholam =

Town in Shan State, Myanmar

Kho Lam ဝဵင်းၶူဝ်လမ် ခိုလမ်မြို့
- Town
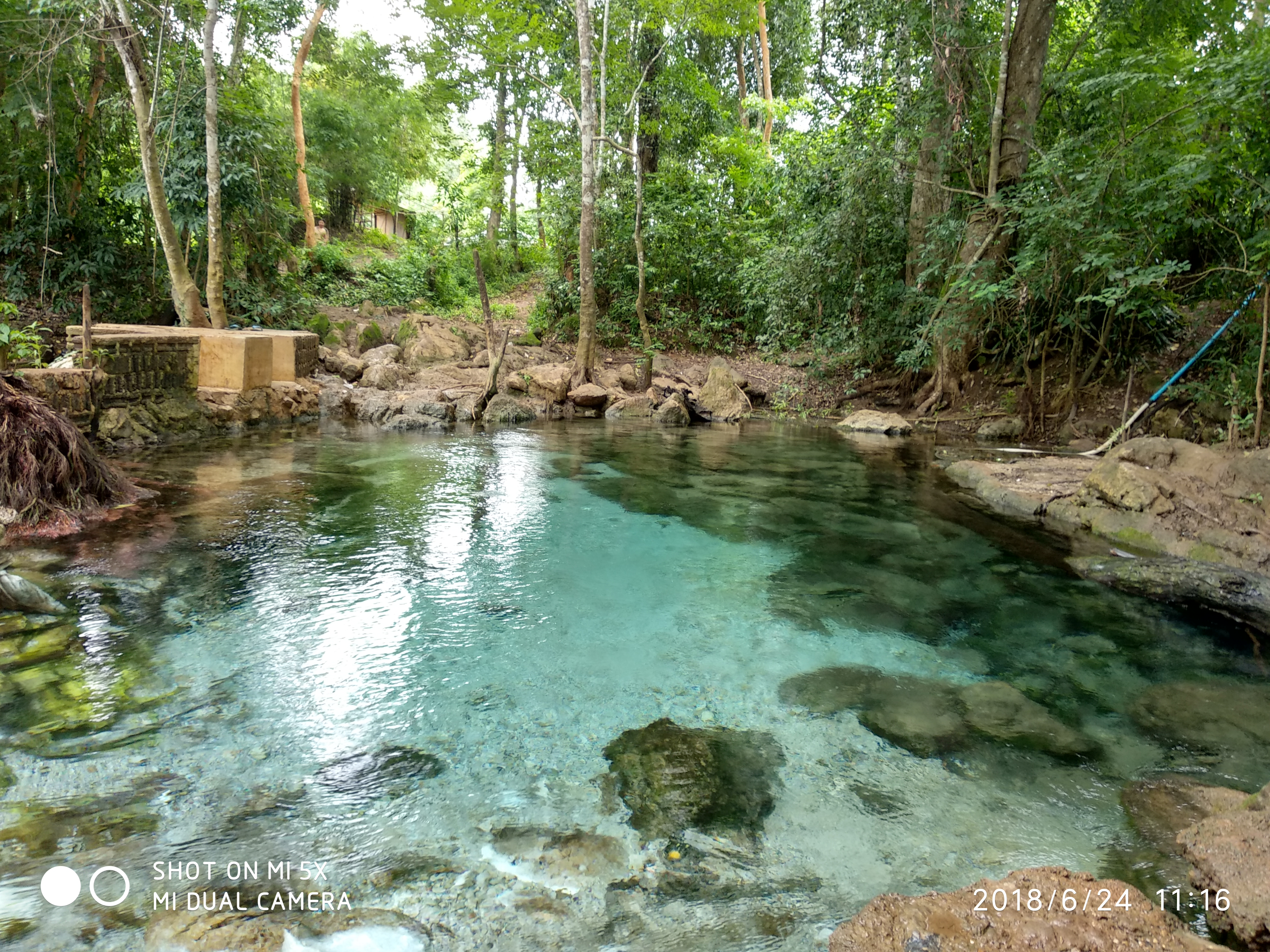
- Kholam Blue Pond

- Location in Myanmar
- Coordinates: 21.1012°N 98.1079°E
- Country: Myanmar
- State: Shan State
- District: Nansang District
- Township: Nansang Township

Area
  - Total: 1.61 sq mi (4.2 km^{2})
- Elevation: 3,255 ft (992 m)

Population
  - Total: 12,246
  - Density: 7,610/sq mi (2,940/km^{2})
- Time zone: UTC+6.30 (MMT)

Kholam (Burmese: ခိုလမ်, Shan: ၶူဝ်လမ်) is a town in Nansang Township in south-central Shan State, Myanmar. It is divided into 6 urban wards and had a population of 12,246 people in 2019. The town is located 30 miles northeast of the township capital of Nansang along National Highway 4. Kholam is the principal town of Kholam subtownship, a statistical subdivision of Nansang Township. According to the 2015 census, the subtownship 24,659 people.

== Economy ==
The town is home to the Eastern Central Command Regional Military Command headquarters The Myanmar Army and local farmers within the town have had land disputes that have been described as continuous seizures of land for the purpose of expanding the military command.

The town has a natural spring called the Kholam Blue Pond (Burmese: ခိုလမ် ရေပြာအိုင်), located between Kholam and Nansang. Over the last decade, it has been developed into a tourist destinations, mostly attracting locals from the surrounding area. The Ministry of Hotels and Tourism laid out plans in 2024 to develop tourism to other nearby attractions like Haingpaw Falls and for Kholam to serve as a central city for travelers going between Taunggyi and Kengtung.

== See also ==
- Nansang Township
