= Keng Hkam =

Keng Hkam ကျိုင်းခမ်း
- Village
- Location in Burma
- Coordinates: 21°52′N 97°22′E
- Country: Burma
- State: Shan State
- District: Loilem District
- Township: Mong Kung Township
- Time zone: UTC+6.30 (MST)

Keng Hkam is a village in Mong Kung Township in the Shan State of Burma. It is located by the Nam Pang River.

Keng Hkam will be one of the communities impacted by the Tasang Dam project.

== History ==
Prior to the end of World War II, the town of Keng Hkam was the capital of Kenghkam State.
