= Na-hkilek =

- Village
- Location in Burma
- Coordinates: 20°57′3″N 98°30′0″E
- Country: Burma
- State: Shan State
- District: Loilem District
- Township: Kunhing Township
- Elevation: 245 m (804 ft)
- Time zone: UTC+6.30 (MST)

Nā-hki-lek or Na-hkilek is a river village on the Salween River in Shan State of eastern Burma. It lies on the confluence of the Salween and the Nam Pang River. A few miles north beyond the junction is said to be "a strange whirlpool, at the place the river is in a gorge between limestone cliffs, which fall smooth and precipitous to the water's edge."

It is located about 120 km east of Kengtung.
