= Kengtawng State =

Former Shan State in Burma

Coordinates: 20.72806°N 98.02°E

Kengtawng State ကျိုင်းတောင်း
- State of the Shan States
- bf. 1800–1959
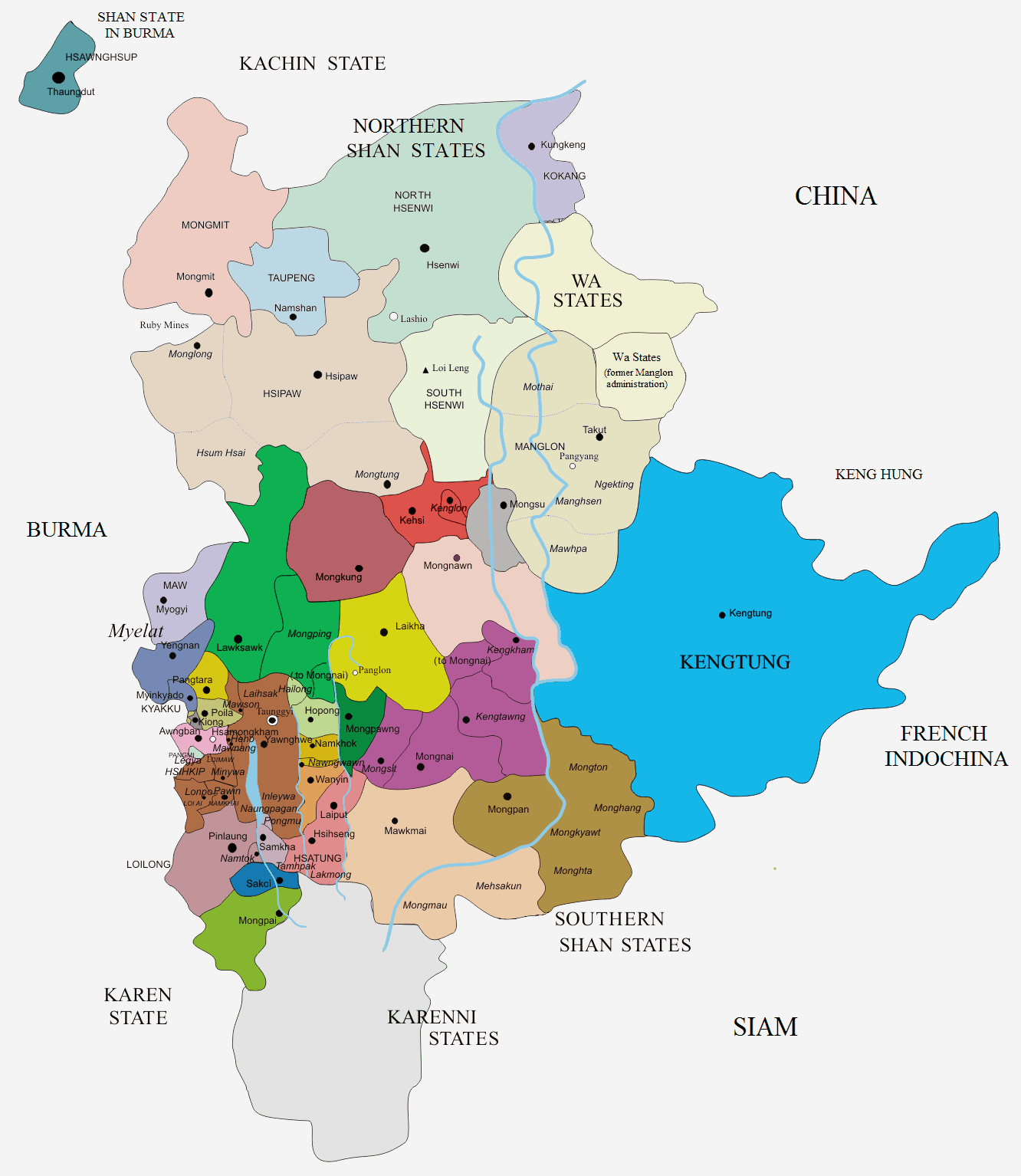
- Kengtawng State in a map of the Shan States
- Capital: Keng Tawng
- Area
- 2,300 km^{2} (890 sq mi)
- History
  - State founded: bf. 1800
  - Abdication of the last ruler: 1959
Succeeded by
Shan State
- The 1901 Census of India conflates the population figures of Mongnai with those of its sub-State of Kengtawng

Kengtawng or Kyaingtaung (Burmese: ကျိုင်းတောင်း) was a Shan state in what is today Burma. The capital was the town of Keng Tawng. The state formed the eastern part of Mongnai State and was separated from it by a mountain range running from north to south averaging 1,300 metres (4,300 ft) in height. Kengtawng was watered by the Nam Teng River that run through most of the state.

== History ==
Kengtawng was a vassal state or dependency of Mongnai State. According to legend Keng Tawng was the town of Khun Sam Law, the hero of an ancient origin myth of the Shan people. However, the early records of Mongnai State are vague and most of Kengtawng's history is obscure.

Late 19th century notorious usurper and warmonger Twet Nga Lu was born in Kengtawng. He was an unfrocked monk whose ambitions and crafty schemes were at the root of widespread bloodshed and destruction in the region in those times. Twet Nga Lu also caused much desolation in his own native state. According to Sir George Scott:

East of the Nam Teng River in the State of Keng Tawng, "the country for nearly twenty miles at a stretch," Mr. Scott reported, "is practically a desert. Yet all along the road old wells and ruinous monasteries and the grass-grown skeletons of former paddy-fields, to say nothing of hill-clearings, showed that formerly there must have been a large population here.... The handful of people who have so far returned to Keng Tawng have settled twenty miles farther south, round the site of the old capital. There is a magnificent banyan-tree, known far and wide as Mai Hung Kan, at Maklang.... The adjoining monastery was burnt by Twet Nga Lu's brigands, and not even the sanctity of the tree which twenty men could not span, under whose branches a fair-sized village might be built, has yet been able to persuade the monks to return. There are not, in fact, enough of the pious in the neighbourhood to support them."

=== Rulers ===
There is no information about the rulers of Kengtawng state.

== See also ==
- Mong Nai
