= Tip Htila =

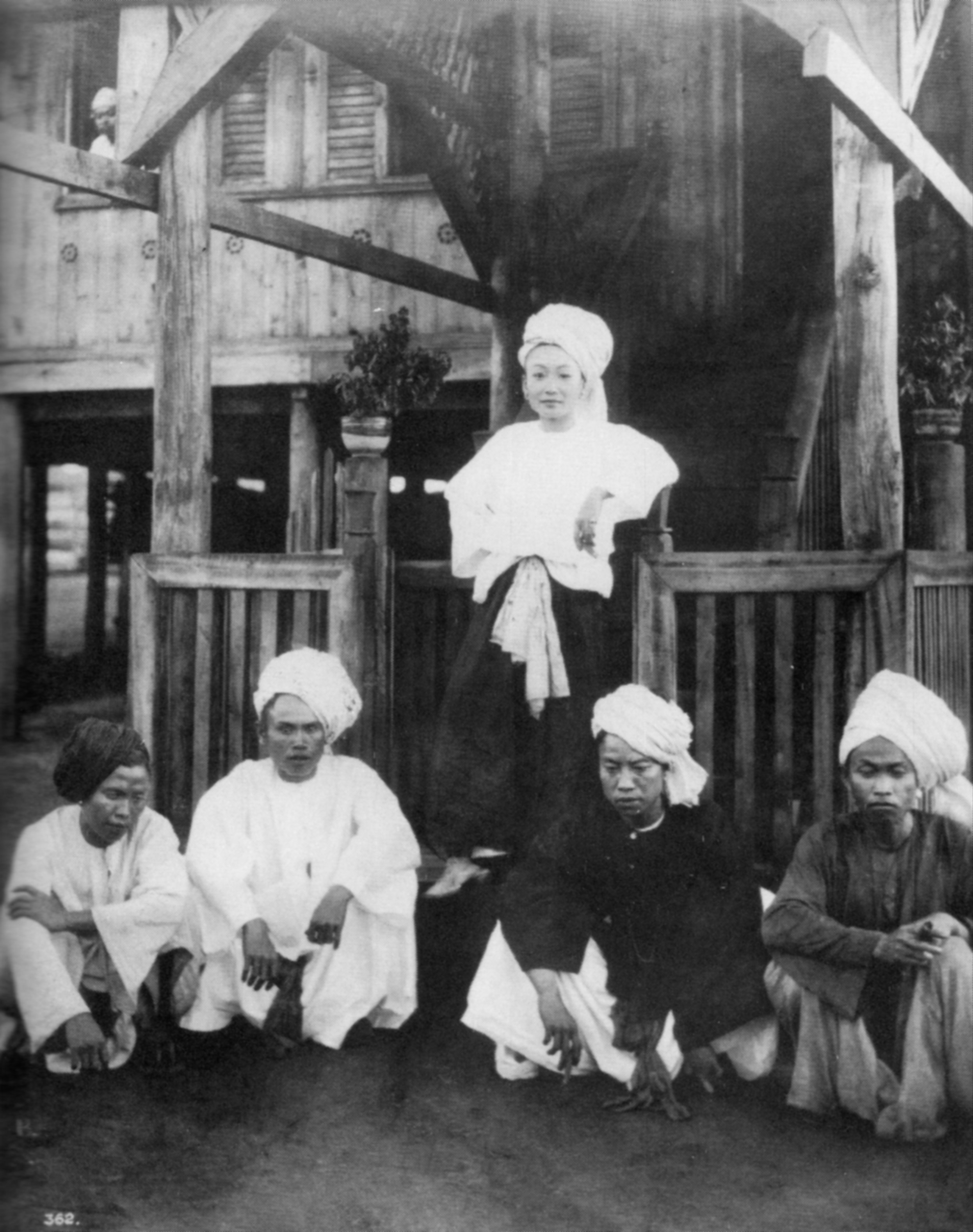

Saopha of Kenghkam
- Reign: 1905 - 1914?
- Predecessor: Hkun Un
- Successor: Hkun Nawng Hkam

Queen consort of Kenghkam
- Reign: 1897 - 1905

Regent of Kengtung
- Reign: 1895 - 1897
- Predecessor: Sao Kao Kham Phu
- Successor: Sao Kawng Kiao Intaleng
- Born: 1874; Kengtung
- Died: 1935 (aged 60–61)
- Spouse: Hkun Un
- Issue: Hkun Nawng Hkam
- House: Kengtung State (by birth); Kenghkam State (by marriage)
- Father: Sao Kawng Tai I
- Religion: Theravada Buddhism

Sao Nang Tip Htila (Burmese: စဝ်နန်းတစ်ထီလာ, Khün: တိပ့္ထီးလား, Thai: เจ้านางทิพย์ธิดา; 1874 — 1935) was a Saopha of Kenghkam State. She was the only female Saopha in Burma and Shan History. She married Hkun Un, Saopha of Kenghkam and became the Mahadevi of Kenghkam. After her husband's death, she became the Saopha in lieu of her adolescent son and became one of the most powerful women in Kenghkam, controlling the state economically and politically. A powerful figure in her own right, she was renowned for her cunning and charisma and was admired by her countrymen and the British.

== Life ==
Tip Htila was born in 1871 as the only daughter of Sao Kawng Tai I, Saopha of Kengtung. She had two siblings: an elder brother (Sao Kawn Kham Hpu), and younger brother (Kawng Kiao Intaleng). She was energetic in her youth, which sometimes got her into trouble with her father. In 1887, at 16, her father died, and her brother became the 52nd Saopha. She was a skilled horseman and was passionate about fighting. She accompanied the Chiang Hung front line.

Her brother Sao Kawn Kham Hpu died in 1895, and his successor, Kawng Kiao Intaleng, was too young to be Saopha, so she temporarily ruled over Kengtung on his behalf. Two years later, after Kawng Kiao Intaleng acceded to the throne, she married Hkun Un, Saopha of Kenghkam, and moved to Kenghkam. She became the Mahadevi of Kengkham. She had a son named Hkun Nawng Hkam. Her husband died when Hkun was 11 and she ruled as the female Saopha for 11 years. Along with Kawng Kiao Intaleng, she attended the Delhi Durbar in 1903 in celebration of the coronation of King Edward VII and Queen Alexandra.

She attended the party of King George V and Queen Mary when they visited British India. Along the way, her royal jewellery disappeared, which her maid allegedly tipped overboard. When the time came to meet the Queen in Delhi along with prestigious rulers from across the Kingdom's protectorate, Tip Htila did so without any of her customary adornments, such that Queen Mary commented, "Tip Htila, I heard that you came across the sea to honour me but your jewellery was lost". Tip Htila then said, "My jewels are gone, yet I have come to see the King." Queen Mary was so moved that she removed one of her rings and gave it to Tip Htila to wear. She was the only ruler who rode on an elephant at the Delhi Durbar Procession.

When her son grew up, he succeeded her. However, in a fit of pique, he shot and killed a servant in the palace. He was then deposed as Saopha, and the state of Kengkham was integrated into Mongnai State.

Tip was a powerful businesswoman, frequently involved in trading elephants and motor cars and later in teak extraction and road-building. According to Maurice Collis who met her in her old age "In her day, she must have been rash, magnificent, and as bold as a lion".
