= Nang Mwe San =

Burmese model

- နန်းမွေစံ
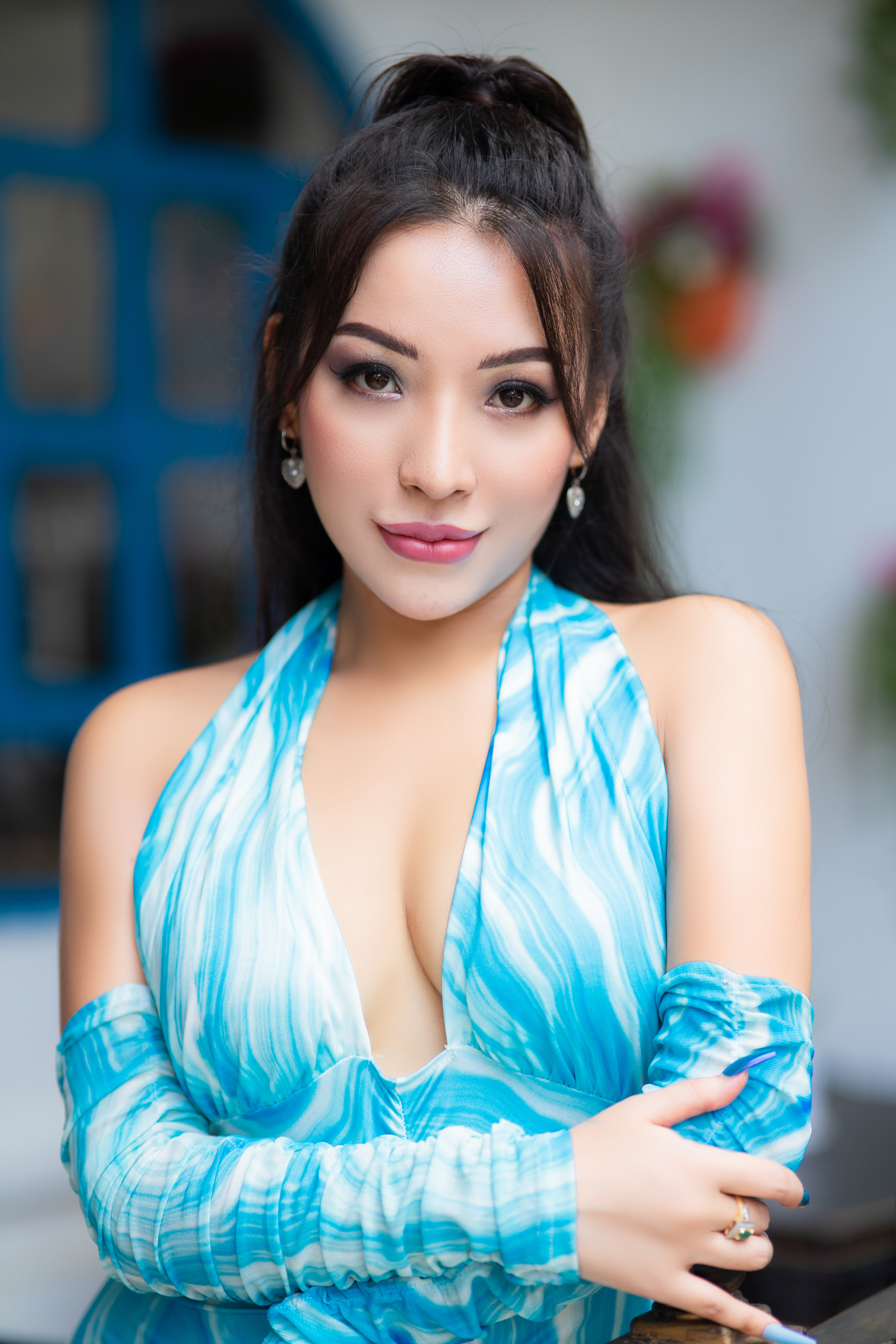
- Born: Nang Mwe San; 23 June 1988 (age 38); Kunhing, Shan State, Myanmar
- Education: University of Medicine 1, Yangon
- Occupations: Model, former medical doctor
- Years active: 2018–present

Nang Mwe San (Burmese: နန်းမွေစံ; born 23 June 1988) is a Burmese model and former medical doctor. According to The Myanmar Times, she is regarded as the country's most renowned sexy model known for her allure. She was featured in The Irrawaddy's "Top Myanmar Sexy Models" list in 2020. In July 2020, she was appointed Kindness Ambassador of YVCT College.

On 5 August 2022, in the aftermath of the 2021 Myanmar coup d'état, she, along with Thinzar Wint Kyaw, was arrested by the military junta under Section 33(a) of the Electronic Law for allegedly earning money through content deemed harmful to Myanmar culture, posted on websites including OnlyFans and Exantria. She is reported to be the first person in Myanmar to be imprisoned for content on OnlyFans, having been sentenced to six years in prison.

== Early life and education ==
Nang Mwe San was born on 23 June 1988 in Kunhing, Shan State, Myanmar into a medical family. Her father, Sai San Win, was a medical doctor who served as a deputy project medical coordinator at Médecins Sans Frontières, and her mother, Kyu Kyu Swe, is also a physician. She attended high school at Basic Education High School No. 2 Kamayut. After excelling in her matriculation exam, she enrolled at the University of Medicine 1, Yangon.

== Career ==
Mwe San initiated posting sexually charged photos of swimwear and lingerie on social media as a hobby, garnering an audience and leading to commercial appearances. She has featured in numerous television advertisements, including campaigns for OK Dollar, Biomanic Plus, and various other commercials. Her sexually charged photos prompted the malaria monitoring and evaluation office in Yangon, where she worked as a medical officer, to request her resignation. In 2019, the Myanmar Medical Council revoked her medical license and instructed her to cease working as a (sexy) model, ensuring she couldn't practice as a doctor again when she didn't comply. She asserted that the confiscation of her medical license was a violation of her human rights. The case and the actions of the Myanmar Medical Council have faced widespread criticism in Myanmar and have been extensively covered in the international media.

Highlighting the distinction between her work as a sexy model and traditional pornography has played a role in mitigating the stigma associated with her career choice in a country where little differentiation is made between the two. Despite the controversy surrounding her expulsion from the medical profession, it has concurrently heightened her popularity, solidifying her status as a national sex symbol. In 2019, she graced the fashion runway at the Myanmar International Fashion Week.

By the close of 2019, she had emerged as the fourth-highest trending individual in Myanmar, as reported by Google. In September 2020, amid the COVID-19 pandemic, she joined OnlyFans in response to fan requests. Nang Mwe San stated that she earned US$50,000 in a single month through the platform. While her videos gained visibility on platforms like PornHub and TubeSafari, they primarily featured compilations of photos from hotel shoots. She asserts that she is the first model from Myanmar to be active on the platform.

== Political activities ==
In the aftermath of the 2021 Myanmar coup d'état, she actively engaged in the anti-coup movement, participating in person at rallies and leveraging her social media presence with 2.2 million followers. Nang Mwe San joined the "We Want Justice" three-finger salute movement, which originated on social media and has garnered support from numerous celebrities. She has been a vocal critic of the country's military coup, expressing her views through videos and actively participating in protests alongside the people, including in front of the Embassy of the United States, Yangon. Nang Mwe San stated,

"I also make a strong play in opposition to (the) military coup. All the generations in Myanmar know what we faced and lost under military rule. We cannot let that happen again. I am proud to participate in this protest."

In May 2022, Nang Mwe San was banned from traveling overseas. The Yangon Passport Office declined to return her passport after she attempted to renew it for her father's medical treatment in Bangkok. As a result, her father, Dr. Sai San Win, died due to a lack of medical treatment. She has reportedly expressed discontent with the decision, deeming it "unfair" as it essentially curtails her right to leave Myanmar. According to the passport office, permission for her travel can now only be granted by the country's Minister of Home Affairs, Soe Htut. In a media interview, Nang Mwe San announced her retirement as a sexy model, stating, "I have to go back to being a doctor to make my father proud."

On 5 August 2022, the military junta initiated a legal case against Nang Mwe San and another popular sexy model, Thinzar Wint Kyaw. The duo is accused of harming Myanmar culture and disseminating sexually explicit photos and videos on social networks. As per an announcement by the state-controlled media MRTV, they have been arrested and detained under Section 33(a) of the Electronic Law for earning money by posting sexually revealing photos on the websites OnlyFans and Extrania. Section 33(a) of the Electronic Law carries a maximum 15-year jail sentence. She was not permitted to have legal representation and had limited rights during the proceedings. On 27 September 2022, she was sentenced to six years in jail by a military court.

On 4 January 2026, she was freed by the military regime commemorate the country’s 78th Independence Day.
