= Lai-Hka =

Lai-Hka ဝဵင်းလၢႆးၶႃႈ လဲချားမြို့
- Town
- Lecha
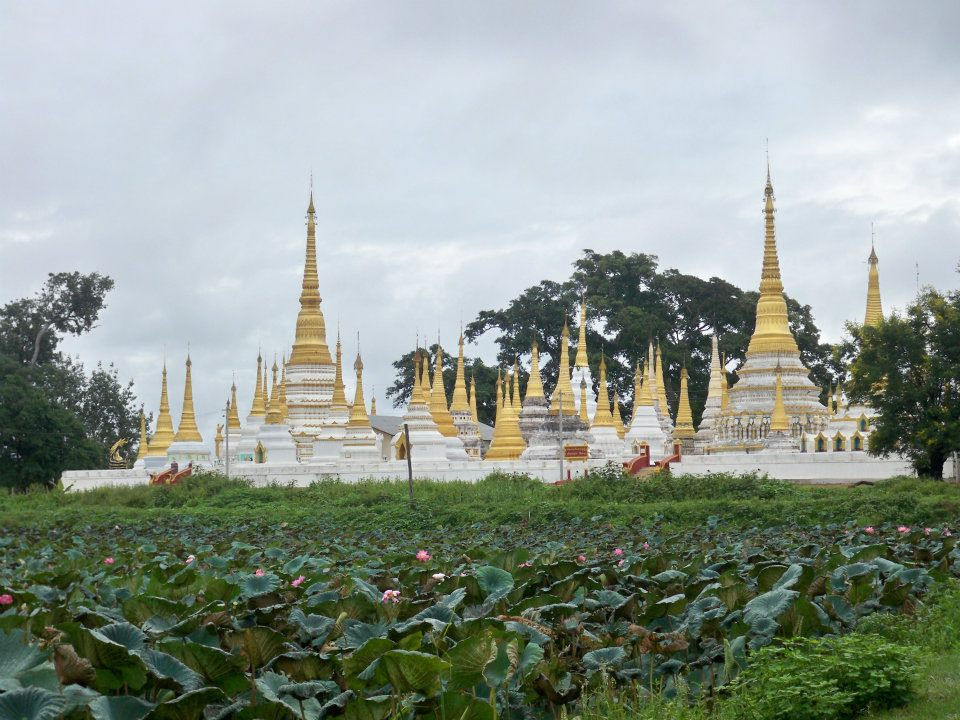

- Location in Myanmar
- Coordinates: 21°16′20″N 97°39′10″E
- Country: Myanmar
- State: Shan State
- District: Loilen District
- Township: Lai-Hka Township

Area
  - Total: 1.52 sq mi (3.9 km^{2})
- Elevation: 10,223 ft (3,116 m)

Population (2023)
  - Total: 8,321
- Time zone: UTC+6.30 (MMT)

Lai-Hka (Shan: ဝဵင်းလၢႆးၶႃႈ) is the principal town of Lai-Hka Township in central Shan State of Myanmar. The town has four wards simply numbered from one through four. Ward Four is the largest containing 3,578 people as of 2023; the town has a total population of 8,321.
