= Laihka State =

Former Shan state in Burma

Coordinates: 21°16′N 97°39′E

Laihka (Legya)
- State of the Shan States
- 1505–1959
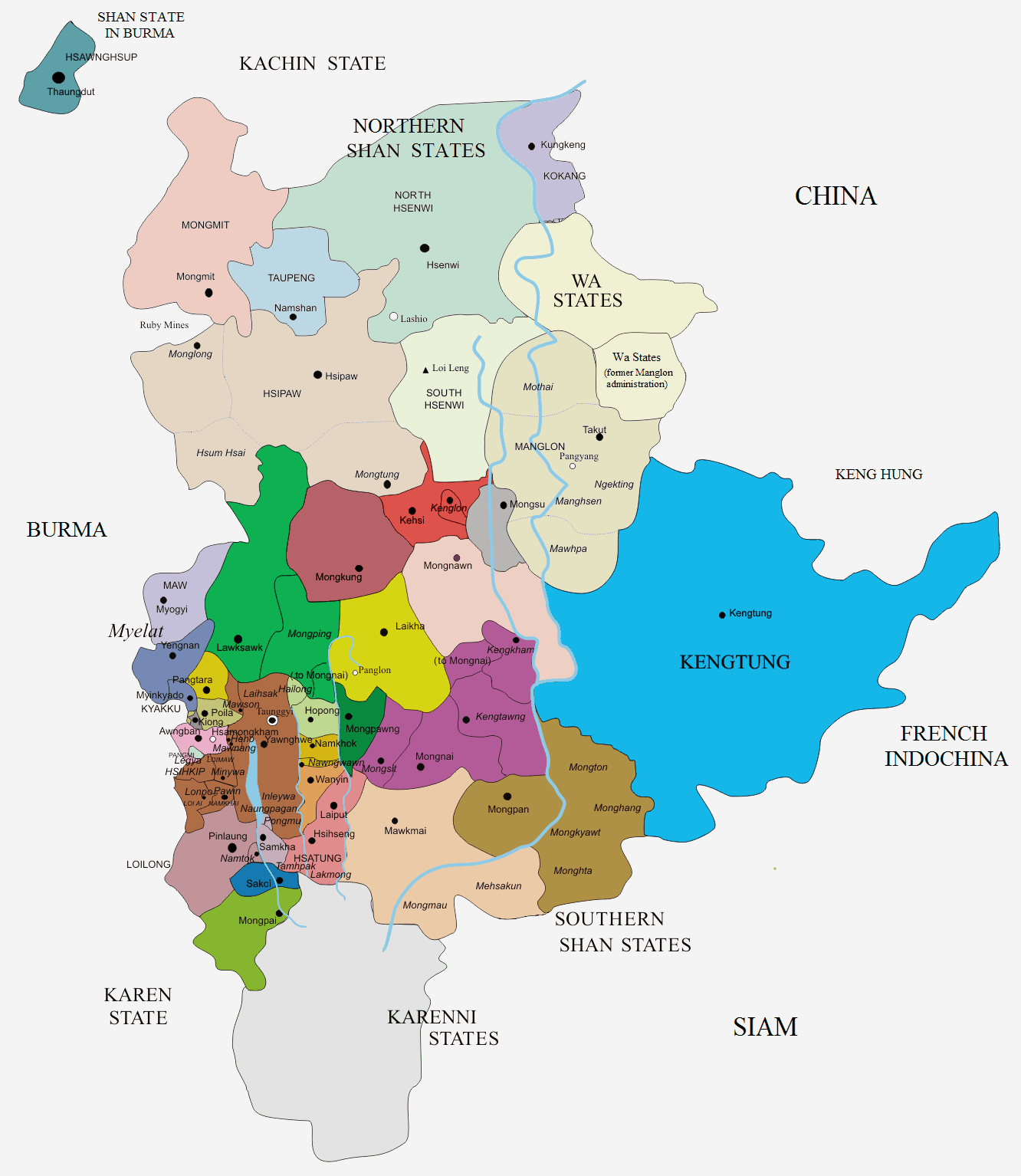
- Laihka State (in yellow) in a map of the Shan States
- Area
  - 1901: 3,711 km^{2} (1,433 sq mi)
- Population
  - 1901: 25,811
- History
  - State founded: 1505
  - Abdication of the last Saopha: 1959
| Preceded by | Succeeded by |
| Hsenwi | Shan State |

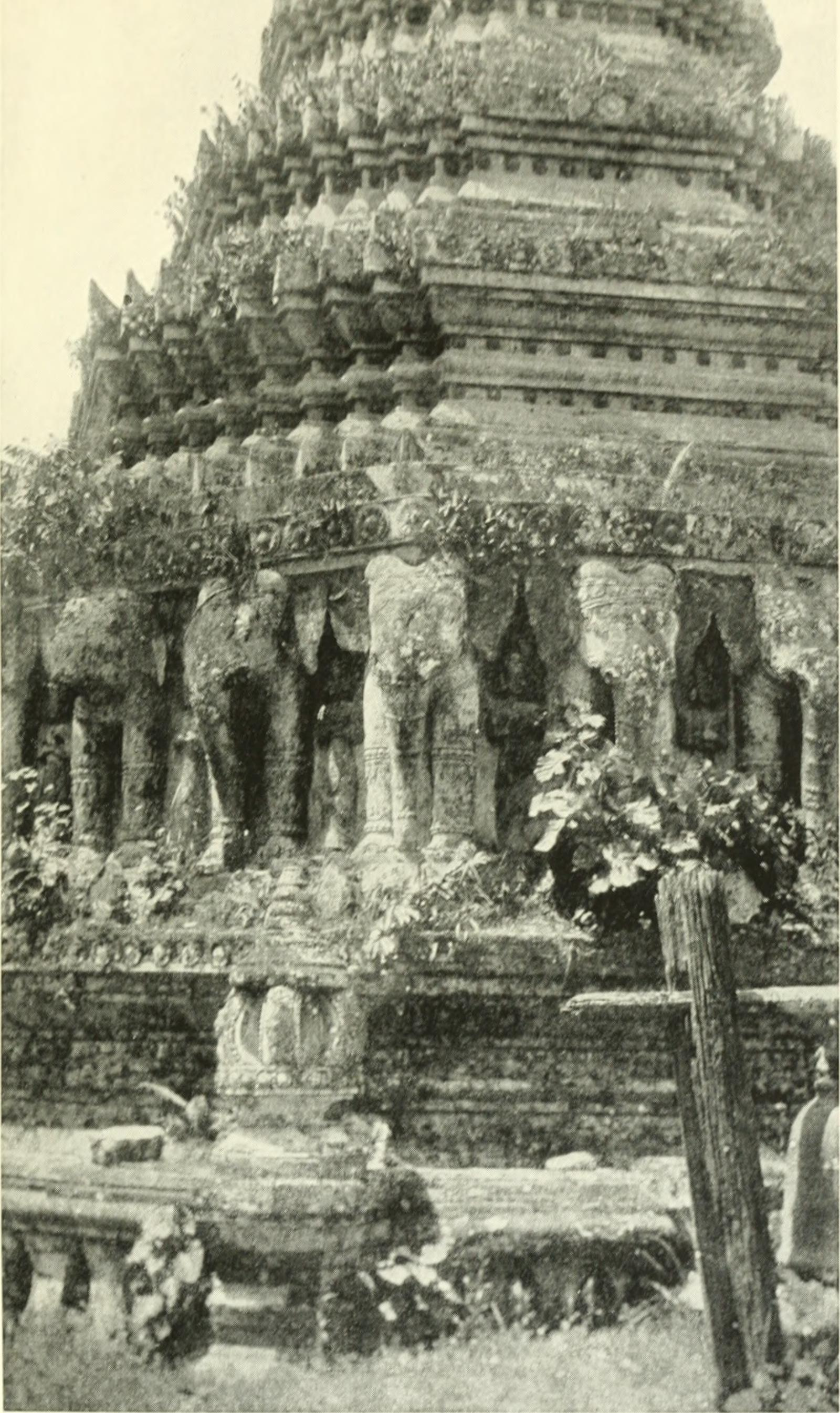
An elephant-supported pagoda in Laihka, a Shan capital which suffered terribly in the civil war that marked the reign of King Thibaw. A very similar pagoda stands in Muong Nan, one of the Lao Shan States

Laihka State (Shan: လၢႆးၶႃႈ), also spelt Legya or Lecha (Burmese: လဲချား), was a state in the central division of the Southern Shan States of Burma, with an area of 3,711 square kilometres (1,433 sq mi).

The general character of the state was hilly and broken, with a mean altitude of a little under 3,000 feet (910 m). The main rivers were the Nam Teng, an important tributary of the Salween, and the Nam Pawn. Laihka, located in the plain of the Nam Teng, was the capital where the saopha had his palace (haw). The town of Panglong, where the Panglong Agreement took place, is located close to Laihka.

== History ==
Traditional legends talk about a predecessor kingdom in the area named Hansavadi. Laihka State was founded in 1505 as a state subordinated to Hsenwi State. On the downfall of King Thibaw civil war broke out, and reduced the population to a few hundred. In 1901 it had risen again to 25,811. About seven-ninths of the land under cultivation consisted of wet rice cultivation. A certain amount of upland rice was also cultivated, and cotton, sugarcane and garden produce made up the rest. Laihka, the capital, was noted for its ironwork, both the iron and the implements made being produced at Pang Long in the west of the state. This and lacquerware were the chief exports, as also a considerable amount of pottery. The imports were chiefly cotton piece-goods and salt.

=== Rulers ===
The rulers bore the title Myosa until mid nineteenth century.

==== Myosas ====
- 1734 - 1794 Khun Lek
- 1794 - 1803 Law Na
- 1803 - 1807 La Hkam
- 1807 - 18.. Hkun Lek

==== Saophas ====
The ritual style was Kambawsa Rahta Mahawunths Thiri Thudamaraza. The saopha start at 1505 the first Sao Khua Hpa and in 1542 the linege of him is vacant Sao Hkun Möng (Hso Han Hpa) the saopha of Hsipaw send his son Hkun Naw to be the saopha here

- 1505–1542 Sao Khua Hpa
- 1542–1567 Hso Naw Hpa
- 1567–1609 Hso Haum Hpa
- 1609–1628 Hso Kyaw Hpa
- 1628–1650 Hso Kawn Hpa
- 1674–1680 Hso Yat Hpa (Sao Ne Ya)
- 1680–1683 The wife of Sao Ne Ya (female), whose name is unknown – Because Sao Ne Ya left no children, his wife succeeded him and reigned for three years until her death.
- 1683–1697 Hso Hkai Hpa
- 1697–1720 Hso Ko Hpa
- 1720–1735 Hso Kluen Hpa
- 1735–1745 Hso Serk Hpa
- 1745–1771 Hso Bu Hpa
- 1771–1794 Hso Pen Hpa
- 1794–1803 Hkun Law Na
- 1803–1807 Sao Hla Hkam
- 1807–1854 Hkun Lek Hpa
- 1854–1856 Phu Hkam Kyaw
- 1856–1860 Hkun Long Hpa
- 1860–1862 Hkun Mawng Hpa (1st time)
- 1862–1866 Hkun Hkawt Hpa
- 1866–1868 The youngest sister of Hkun Hkawt (female), whose name is unknown – She was also one of Queens consort of Burma, because the monarch of Burma had many wives. When Hkun Hkawt died in 1866, she was appointed as ruler of Laihka and governed the State for two years.
- 1868–1879 Hkun Mawng Hpa (2nd time)
- 1879–1882 Vacant
- 1882–1928 Hkun Lai
- 1928–1952 Sao Num
