= Khun San Law and Nan Oo Pyin =

Shan folkloric figures

Khun San Law and Nan Oo Pyin (Shan: ၶုၼ်းသၢမ်လေႃး ၼၢင်းဢူးပဵမ်ႇ; also spelled as Khun Sam Law–Nang Oo Peim; Burmese: ခွန်ဆမ်လောနဲ့ နန်းဦးပျဉ် or ခွန်ဆမ်လောနဲ့နန်းဦးပြင်) is a tragic love story from Shan folklore. It tells the tale of a young man, Khun San Law, who defies an arranged marriage to pursue true love and marries Nan Oo Pyin, only to face a series of heartbreaking events that lead to their untimely deaths and their transformation into stars. To this day, the story is told through novels, cartoons, films, and songs. The story is considered the Shan equivalent of William Shakespeare's Romeo and Juliet.

The story is an important piece of literature for the Shan people. It is believed to have been created around the 1870s by a 19th-century Shan female writer, Nang Kham Ku (1853−1919), who based it on a true story.

== Story ==
Khun San Law hailed from Keng Tawng and was the only son of a wealthy family. One day, his mother arranged for him to marry a local girl, Nan Oo Pan, who secretly admired him. Eager to marry Khun San Law, she persuaded her mother to propose the match. However, Khun San Law had no interest in her and declined the arrangement. To avoid further pressure, he devised a plan to trade in other towns, telling his mother he would consider the marriage upon his return. His mother reluctantly agreed.

While in Mong Kung, Khun San Law encountered Nan Oo Pyin, and they quickly fell in love. During one of their dates near Tain Creek, Khun San Law expressed his feelings, but the noise of the river made it hard for Nan Oo Pyin to hear him clearly. Turning to the river, she said, "Dear Tain Creek, could you quiet down? I can't hear Khun San Law clearly." Legend has it that from that day, the waters of Tain Creek have flowed quietly. Eventually, Khun San Law married Nan Oo Pyin and brought her to his hometown.

When Khun San Law's mother learned of the marriage, she was furious and harbored deep resentment toward Nan Oo Pyin. However, she pretended to accept the union while secretly tormenting her daughter-in-law whenever Khun San Law was away trading. When Nan Oo Pyin became pregnant, her mother-in-law grew even angrier and plotted to harm her unborn child. Upon learning of this cruel scheme, Nan Oo Pyin fled back to her hometown.

While traveling home, Nan Oo Pyin experienced severe abdominal pain halfway through the journey and gave birth. Tragically, the baby was stillborn. She placed the lifeless body between two trees and continued her journey to her parents' home.

Legend says the baby's spirit transformed into an Oo Ah bird (Asian koel) and began searching for its father. This is why the bird's mournful cries, rendered as "Oo Ah" in Burmese, are interpreted by the Shan people as "Poh Wei" (Father!).

Heartbroken and physically weak, Nan Oo Pyin died immediately upon reaching her home. Meanwhile, Khun San Law returned from his journey, only to discover that his beloved wife was missing. The devastating truth soon dawned on him. Without delay, he mounted his horse and rode to Mong Kung, only to find Nan Oo Pyin had already died. Overwhelmed with grief, he rushed to her body, wept bitterly, and then took his dagger to end his own life.

The couple was buried together. However, when Khun San Law's mother learned of the tragic events, she cursed them, vowing they would never be reunited, even in their future lives. She traveled to the village where they were buried and placed a bamboo carrying pole with three joints between their tombs, ensuring their eternal separation.

According to Shan legend, Khun San Law's spirit transformed into the star Betelgeuse, while Nan Oo Pyin's spirit became the star Rigel. The three-jointed bamboo pole is said to have manifested as the constellation Orion, which appears positioned between the two stars, symbolizing their eternal separation.

Some versions of the story suggest that Khun San Law's mother was actually his stepmother rather than his biological mother, citing the cruelty of her actions.

== In popular culture ==
In 2014, Sai Jerng Harn, a former pop star, and Sao Hsintham, a Buddhist monk, initiated the "Shan Movement" in Keng Tawng, a controversial social and religious movement. Sai Jerng Harn, a central figure in the movement, claimed to be the reincarnation of Khun San Law. This claim was met with strong opposition from the Shan Sangha (Shan Buddhist Council), who accused him of compromising the purity of Buddhism.

Shan immigrants in Chiang Mai, Thailand, have adopted the legend of Khun San Law as part of their cultural identity. They often incorporate the story into their celebrations of Shan Valentine's Day, connecting themselves to the legendary figure.
