= Loilem =

Loilem လွႆလႅမ်
- Town
- Location in Burma
- Coordinates: 20°55′30″N 97°33′50″E
- Country: Myanmar
- Division: Shan State
- Admin. district: Loilem District
- Admin. township: Loilem Township

Area
  - Total: 5.3 sq mi (14 km^{2})
- Elevation: 4,531 ft (1,381 m)

Population (2023)
  - Total: 15,748
  - Density: 3,000/sq mi (1,100/km^{2})
- Time zone: UTC+6.30 (MST)

Loilem (Shan: လွႆလႅမ်; also Loilen or Loi-lem) is a town in the Shan State of central-eastern Burma. It is the principal town in Loilem Township in Loilem District.

== Climate ==
Climate data for Loilem, elevation 1,355 m (4,446 ft), (1981–2010, extremes 2001–2010)
Month	Jan	Feb	Mar	Apr	May	Jun	Jul	Aug	Sep	Oct	Nov	Dec	Year
Record high °C (°F)	28.5 (83.3)	30.0 (86.0)	33.0 (91.4)	36.0 (96.8)	35.5 (95.9)	31.5 (88.7)	29.5 (85.1)	29.5 (85.1)	29.5 (85.1)	30.0 (86.0)	29.5 (85.1)	27.5 (81.5)	36.0 (96.8)
Mean daily maximum °C (°F)	23.8 (74.8)	26.0 (78.8)	29.0 (84.2)	30.2 (86.4)	27.7 (81.9)	26.6 (79.9)	26.0 (78.8)	25.5 (77.9)	25.5 (77.9)	25.0 (77.0)	23.5 (74.3)	22.3 (72.1)	25.9 (78.6)
Mean daily minimum °C (°F)	4.2 (39.6)	6.8 (44.2)	10.7 (51.3)	14.0 (57.2)	15.1 (59.2)	16.1 (61.0)	16.2 (61.2)	15.8 (60.4)	14.7 (58.5)	13.0 (55.4)	9.2 (48.6)	5.2 (41.4)	11.8 (53.2)
Record low °C (°F)	−4.0 (24.8)	−2.0 (28.4)	1.0 (33.8)	5.0 (41.0)	8.0 (46.4)	10.0 (50.0)	10.0 (50.0)	10.0 (50.0)	9.0 (48.2)	4.5 (40.1)	−2.0 (28.4)	−4.0 (24.8)	−4.0 (24.8)
Average rainfall mm (inches)	6.5 (0.26)	9.3 (0.37)	12.9 (0.51)	62.3 (2.45)	252.4 (9.94)	418.4 (16.47)	429.9 (16.93)	391.2 (15.40)	262.1 (10.32)	176.1 (6.93)	79.4 (3.13)	13.7 (0.54)	2,114.2 (83.24)
Source: Norwegian Meteorological Institute
