= Loilem Township =

Loilem
- Township
- Location in Loilem district
- Coordinates: 20°55′30″N 97°33′15″E
- Country: Myanmar
- State: Shan State
- District: Loilem District
- Capital: Loilen

Area
  - Total: 501.62 sq mi (1,299.2 km^{2})
- Elevation: 4,436 ft (1,352 m)

Population (2023)
  - Total: 131,344
- Time zone: UTC+6.30 (MMT)

Loilem Township is a township of Loilem District in the Shan State of Myanmar. The principal town is Loilem. The township also contains Panglong and its corresponding Panglong Subtownship. The township as a whole has 310 villages grouped into 19 village tracts.

In 2018, the Myanmar Army was accused of committing war crimes in the township. In November 2019, police destroyed several acres of poppy plantations in the township.
