= Lai-Hka Township =

Lai-Hka Township လၢႆးၶႃႈ၊ ၸႄႈဝဵင်း လဲချားမြို့နယ် Lecha Legya
- Township
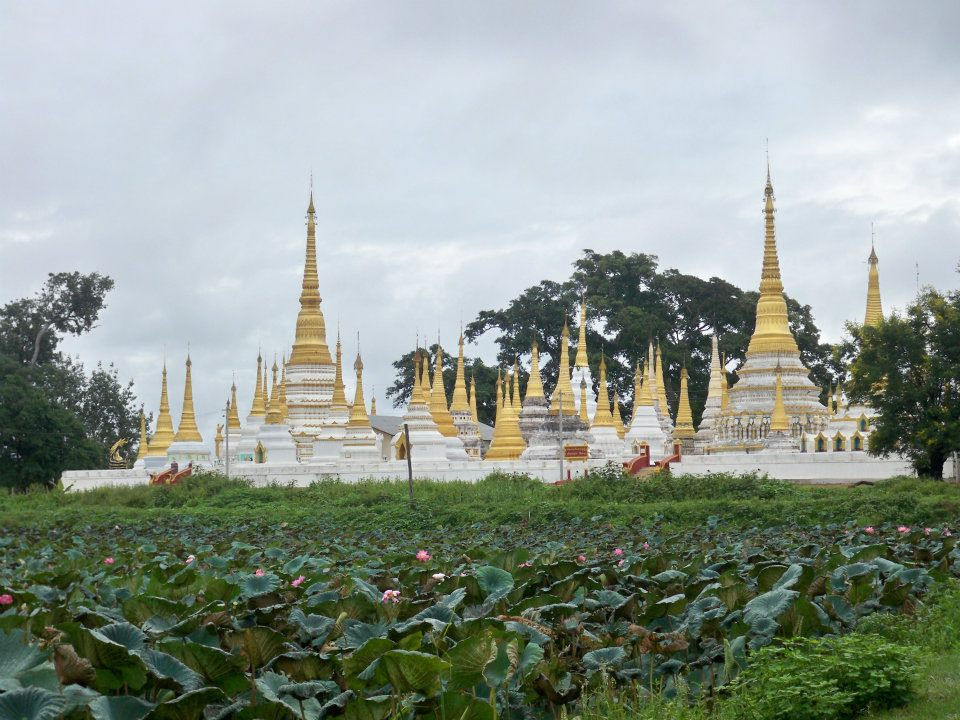
- Pawrana Saeditaw Buddhist temple

- Location in Loilem district
- Coordinates: 21°16′20″N 97°39′10″E
- Country: Myanmar
- State: Shan State
- Shan: Loilen District
- Capital: Lai-Hka

Area
  - Total: 913.92 sq mi (2,367.0 km^{2})
- Elevation: 3,186 ft (971 m)

Population (2023)
  - Total: 52,382
- Time zone: UTC+6.30 (MMT)

Lai-Hka Township (Shan: ဝဵင်းလၢႆးၶႃႈ), also known as Legya Township (Burmese: လဲချားမြို့နယ်), is the former capital of Laihka State, one of the former southern Shan States. The township contains only one town- the principal town of Lai-Hka, which contains 4 wards. The rural part of the township contains 134 villages grouped into 19 village tracts. Agriculture is the main industry in Lai-Hka, primarily growing rice, tea, oranges and peanuts.

== History ==
Lai-Hka Township has had a turbulent and unstable history, with conflicts between the Shan State Army-South (SSA-S) and the Burmese Army. In the first half of 2009, there were at least four battles every month and the SPDC retaliated against villagers by confiscating property, extortion and forced relocation.

At the end of July 2009, more than five hundred houses were burnt and 30 villages forcibly relocated in the township of Lai-Hka.

On 6 August 2024, the district was the site of a skirmish between the Myanmar military and the Shan State Army.
