= Panglong, Southern Shan State =

Panglong ပင်လုံ ပၢင်လူင်
- Town
- Pinlon
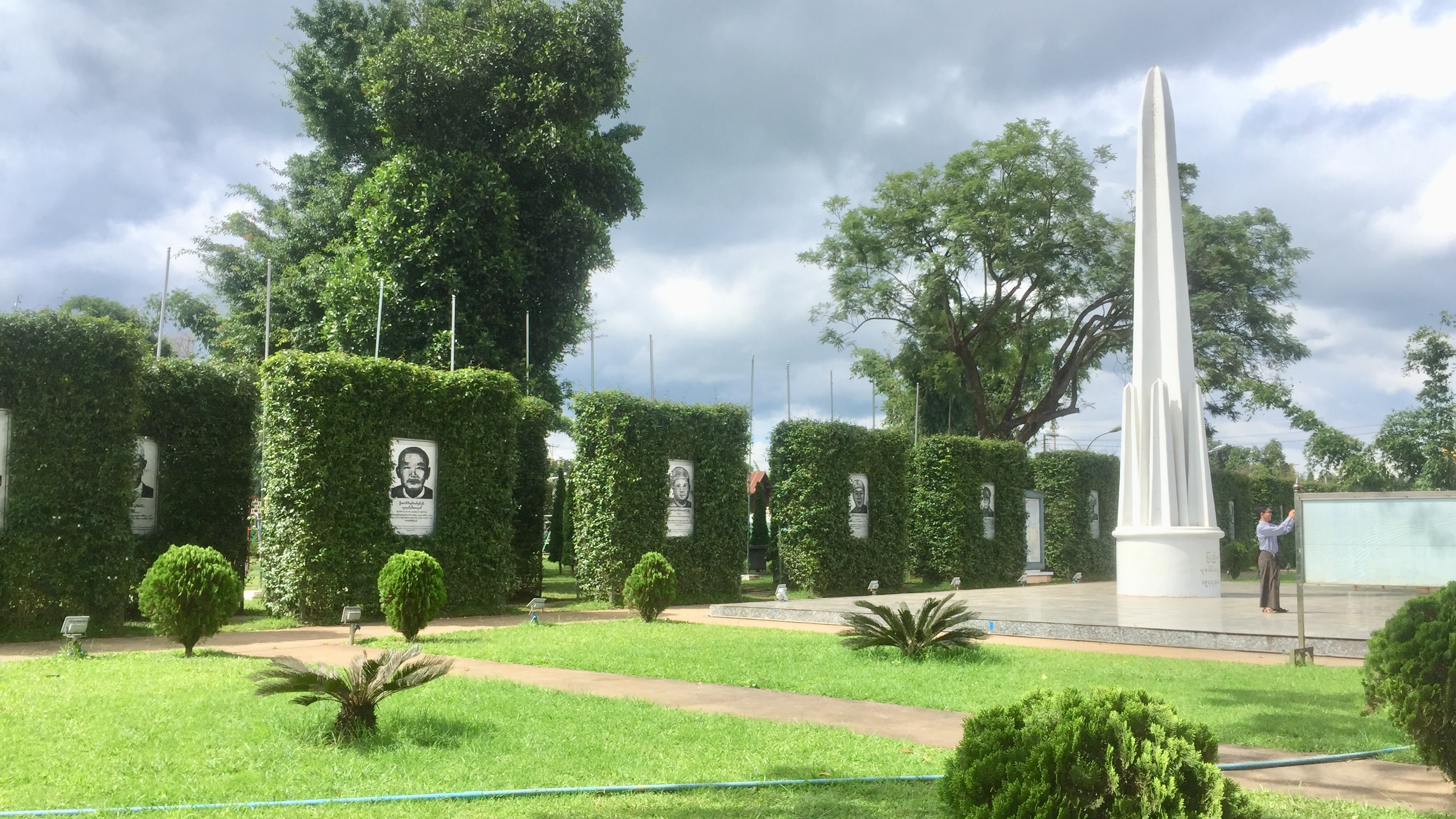
- Panglong Independence Monument

- Location in Myanmar (Burma)
- Coordinates: 20°59′30″N 97°31′15″E
- Country: Myanmar
- Division: Shan
- District: Loilem District
- Township: Loilem Township

Area
  - Total: 7.87 sq mi (20.4 km^{2})
- Elevation: 4,482 ft (1,366 m)

Population (2023)
  - Total: 31,964
  - Religions: Buddhism; Christianity
- Time zone: UTC+6.30 (MMT)

Panglong (Shan: ပၢင်လူင်, Paang⁰long⁰, [pɑːŋ˨˦ loŋ˨˦]), officially Pinlon (ပင်လုံ, /pɪ̀ɴlòʊɴ/) is a town in Loilem Township of Loilem District, southern Shan State, Myanmar. Administratively, Panglong town is divided into four major wards, commonly known as Ward 1, Ward 2, Ward 3 and Ward 4. According to local administrative data, the town had a population of approximately 31,964 people in 2023. Education is another important part of Panglong's development. The town is home to three major higher-education institutions: Panglong University, University of Computer Studies (Panglong), and Technological University (Panglong).

== History ==
Panglong, also known as Pinlon, is a historic town in Loilem Township, Southern Shan State, Myanmar. The town is best known for its important role in Myanmar's history as the site of the Panglong Conference, where the Panglong Agreement was signed on 12 February 1947. The event brought together representatives of different ethnic communities and the Burmese government and became an important milestone in the country's journey toward independence and national unity. This town was the site where the Panglong Agreement took place during the Panglong Conference.

Just over a mile to the north of the town, there are two important places. One is Panglong University. And the other one is the Nang Kin Pu Pagoda, which has a historical link with the myth of Nang Kin Pu, or the Crab Eating Lady, with archaeological sites surrounding the area connected to the story.
