= Myanmar Medical Council =

The Myanmar Medical Council (Burmese: မြန်မာနိုင်ငံဆေးကောင်စီ; MMC) is the national regulatory authority governing medical practice in Myanmar. Established under the Myanmar Medical Council Law (2000), it serves as the successor to the Burma Medical Council, which was founded in 1957 during the post-independence era. It is responsible for maintaining standards in medical education and practice, including the registration of physicians, issuance of licenses to practice, and enforcement of professional ethics.

== History ==
The MMC was originally established as the Burma Medical Council under the Burma Medical Council Act of 1957, forming the first regulatory body for medical professionals in the post-independence era.

On January 14, 2000, the State Peace and Development Council (SPDC) enacted the Myanmar Medical Council Law, which replaced the 1957 act and formally established the modern Myanmar Medical Council. This law outlined the council's objectives, duties, and powers, solidifying its role as the central authority for the medical profession. A significant development in the council's history occurred on April 9, 2015, with the amendment of the Myanmar Medical Council Law. This amendment was aimed at granting the council greater independence and expanding its role beyond the basic functions of registration and licensing. The reformed council, which came into effect on February 6, 2016, was envisioned as a more autonomous body with a comprehensive mandate to oversee good medical practice, ethics, and the accreditation of medical schools and institutions.

The MMC started issuing the Specialist Licence to Myanmar doctors in 2018. This license is issued to doctors who have been appointed as specialists in the Ministry of Health and Sports, those appointed as specialists in the Medical Corps of the Ministry of Defence, and doctors who can provide evidence of having served for at least two years under the supervision of relevant senior specialists after obtaining a Master of Medical Science degree.

The MMC exempted doctors who actively and diligently participated in the diagnosis and treatment of COVID-19 from one year's worth of general and specialist medical license renewal fees. This exemption was granted for the period from July 1, 2020, to June 30, 2023, in honor of their contributions.

== Structure and leadership ==
=== Central Council and Executive Committee ===
The MMC operates under the guidance of a Central Council and an Executive Committee. The Central Council and Executive Committee members are selected through a systematic appointment process outlined in the law, ensuring the MMC fulfills its regulatory functions. The Central Council comprises various members, including the Director of Medical Services from the Ministry of Defence, rectors from medical institutes, representatives from the Myanmar Medical Association, and other senior medical professionals. The Executive Committee is responsible for implementing the duties and functions of the council.

The Executive Committee comprises the following individuals:

- Chairman
- Vice-Chairman
- Council Secretary
- Council Joint Secretary
- Council Treasurer
- Ten Council Members

The MMC operates under the Myanmar Medical Council Law (2015), enacted by the Union Parliament. Key leadership positions, including the chairman and vice-chairman, are elected by the members of the council for a four-year term. However, the government retains authority to directly appoint three Patrons to the council. While the MMC is designated as an independent body, it remains accountable to the government through the Ministry of Health.

=== Central Council ===
The Central Council is formed by the Patrons, which includes no more than 65 individuals. It comprises the following:

- Director-General, Department of Public Health
- Director-General, Department of Medical Services
- Director-General, Department of Medical Human Resources Development and Management
- Director-General, Department of Medical Research
- Director-General, Department of Food and Drug Administration
- A senior official from the Medical Services Directorate, Commander-in-Chief of Defence Services (Army) Office
- No more than ten rectors from medical universities
- The President and two members of the Myanmar Medical Specialists Association
- The President and two members of the Myanmar Medical Association
- Heads of the Health Departments from Union Territories, Regions, and States
- A senior Professor and Head of the Forensic Medicine Department from a medical university
- Seven retired senior doctors who are interested in the Council's activities and have earned public trust and respect
- One registered non-civilian doctor from each Union Territory, Region, and State, elected by registered doctors
- Two non-medical professionals who are trusted and respected by the public

== Controversies ==
In 2019, the MMC permanently revoked the medical license of Dr. Nang Mwe San, a physician who had also pursued a career as a sexy model. The council's decision was based on her posting of photos on social media platforms, such as Facebook and Instagram, which featured her in swimwear and lingerie. The MMC's letter to Dr. Nang Mwe San cited her attire as being "not in accordance with Myanmar culture and tradition." The council had previously issued her a warning in January 2019, ordering her to cease posting such images and to delete existing ones. Her failure to comply with this directive led to the revocation of her license. She asserted that the confiscation of her medical license was a violation of her human rights. The case and the actions of the Myanmar Medical Council have faced widespread criticism in Myanmar and have been extensively covered in the international media.

Following the 2021 Myanmar coup d'état, the MMC became involved in political controversies as many doctors and healthcare workers joined the Civil Disobedience Movement (CDM), a widespread protest against military rule. International observers and human rights organizations have reported that the military-appointed authorities allegedly used the MMC to take disciplinary action against medical professionals who participated in the CDM, including suspending or revoking their medical licenses.

One widely cited case is that of Dr. Pyae Phyo Naing, a 29-year-old surgeon who became a prominent supporter of the CDM. He was charged with incitement under Section 505(a) of the Penal Code and went into hiding to avoid arrest. In June 2021, while he remained in hiding, the MMC revoked his medical license, citing violations of council rules and regulations due to his involvement in the movement. State-controlled media publicized the decision, alongside similar actions taken against other healthcare workers, in what was widely viewed as an attempt to discourage participation in the CDM and pressure medical personnel to return to work under the military administration.

These actions have drawn criticism from organizations such as Human Rights Watch and the World Medical Association, which argue that the MMC's measures were politically motivated and undermined medical neutrality. Supporters of the CDM claim that the council's independence was compromised, while the military government maintained that it was enforcing professional regulations.
