= Namhkok =

Historic state in Myanmar

Coordinates: 20°37′28.4″N 97°12′15.3″E

Namhkok (also known as Nankok) was a Shan state in what is today Burma.
