= Keng Tawng =

Keng Tawng ၵဵင်းတွင်း
- Town
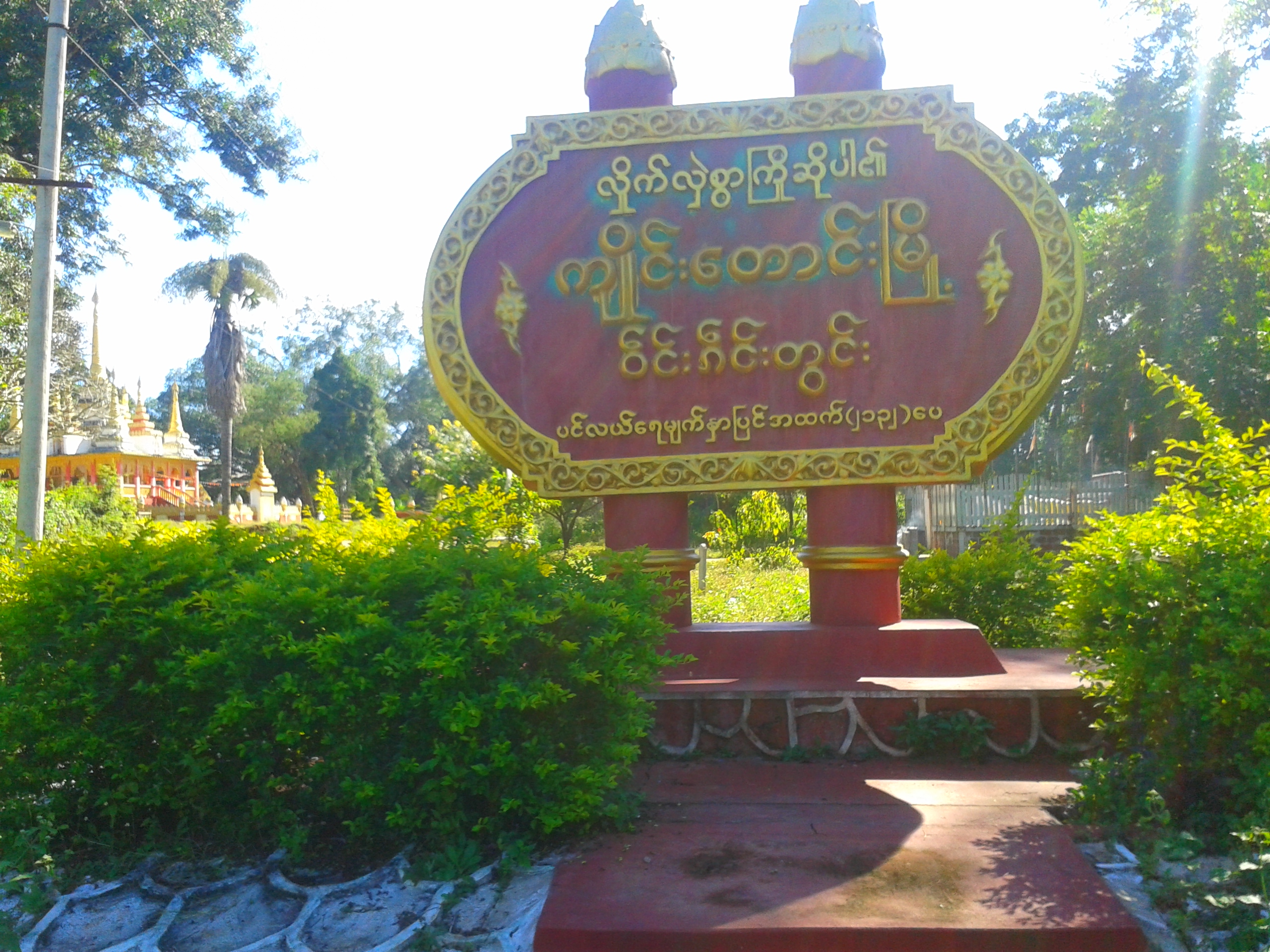

- Location in Myanmar
- Coordinates: 20.72806°N 98.02°E
- Country: Myanmar
- State: Shan State
- District: Nansang District
- Township: Mong Nai Township
- Subtownship: Keng Tawng Subtownship
- Time zone: UTC+6.30 (MMT)

Keng Tawng (Shan: ၵဵင်းတွင်း; Burmese: ကျိုင်းတောင်းမြို့; also spelled Kyaingtaung) is a river town in Mong Nai Township in the Shan State of Myanmar. The area of the town is watered by the Nam Teng River.

== History ==
Prior to the end of World War II, Kengtawng state was one of the substates of Mongnai State, in the Southern Shan States.

Keng Tawng was the town of Khun Sam Law, the hero of an ancient legend of the Shan people. It was also the birthplace of notorious usurper and warmonger Twet Nga Lu.

There is a hydroelectric project in the area of the town. Places like the iconic Kengtawng Falls are threatened by the project.

In the popular Shan folktale Khun San Law and Nan Oo Pyin, Keng Tawng is the hometown of the male character, Khun San Law.
