= Nansang Township =

Nansang ၸႄႈဝဵင်းၼမ်ႉၸၢင် နမ့်စန်မြို့နယ်
- Township
- Nan San Township
- Location in Nansang district
- Coordinates: 20°53′20″N 97°44′10″E
- Country: Myanmar
- State: Shan State
- District: Nansang District
- Capital: Nansang

Area
  - Total: 2.09 sq mi (5.4 km^{2})
- Elevation: 3,255 ft (992 m)

Population (2019)
  - Total: 119,931
  - Density: 57,400/sq mi (22,200/km^{2})
  - Ethnicities: Shan; Bamar; Pa-O; Yin; Palaung; Lahu; Kokang; Lisu; Myaungzi
  - Religions: Buddhism; Christianity; Islam
- Time zone: UTC+6.30 (MMT)

Nansang or Namsang Township (Burmese: နမ့်စန်မြို့နယ်) is a township of Nansang District in the Shan State of Myanmar. The principal town is Nansang. The township has two towns with 11 urban wards in total between them as well as 20 village tracts grouping 196 villages.

To prevent confusion with Namhsan Township in northern Shan State, it is sometimes disambiguated as Nan San (South) Township.

On April 30, 2022, new districts were expanded across the country. Nansang Township was separated from Loilem District and together with two other townships formed the new Nansang District.

The townships is relatively diverse, with the Shan people making up the largest plurality at only 39.89% of the population in 2019, followed by Bamar and Pa-O people at 15.3% and 12.15% respectively.

== See also ==
- Namsang
