= Mong Nai =

Mong Nai: မိုးနဲ; မိူင်းၼၢႆး; Mo Ne
- Town
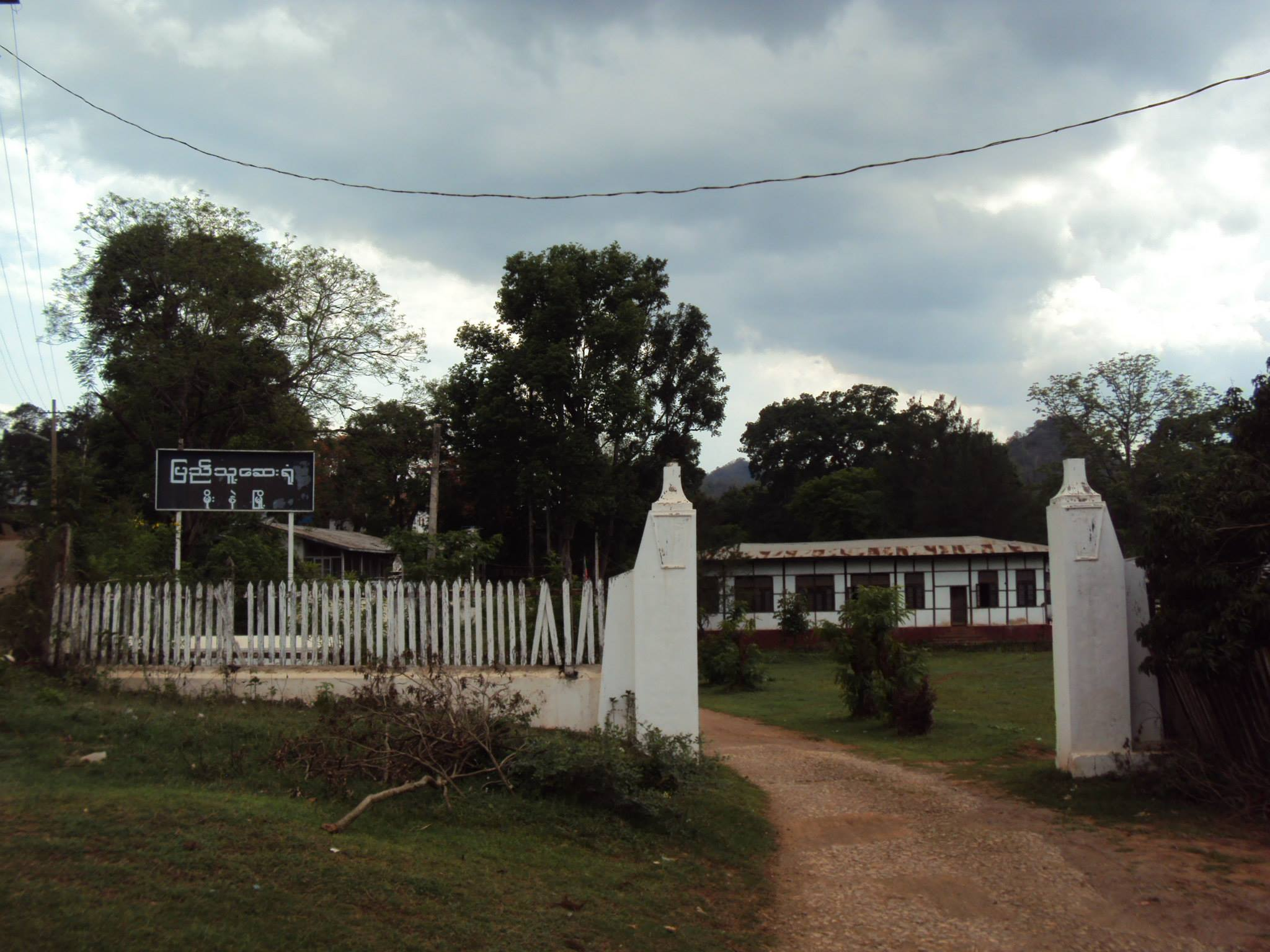

- Location in Myanmar
- Coordinates: 20°31′N 97°52′E
- Country: Myanmar
- State: Shan State
- District: Nansang District
- Township: Mong Nai Township
- Time zone: UTC+6.30 (MMT)

Möng Nai or Mongnai is a town in Mong Nai Township in the Shan State of Myanmar (Burma). Mong is equivalent to Mueang.

== History ==
Prior to World War II, the state of Möng Nai (Burmese, Mo-Ne) was one of the largest and the most important of the States in the Eastern subdivision of the Southern Shan States. The early history of Möng Nai is buried in obscurity. The town has been several times burnt, as it has always been the centre of disturbances in the Southern Shan States, and all records have perished in the various fires.

The original city, according to Burmese accounts, was founded in the year 24 of Religion (519 BC) by Sao Hkio, who was the first of a line of independent Chiefs. In about 1223 AD, Möng Nai was conquered by Sam Long Hpa of the Northern Shan Empire and became tributary to Se Lan, the old Mong Mi line of Saophas (Sawbwas) was then put in charge of the State.

=== 2002 massacre ===
On the night of 14 October 2002 during a religious holiday the Burmese army shelled the town at 11:00pm leaving 6 men and 64 women dead and another 21 injured.
