= Kunhing =

- Town
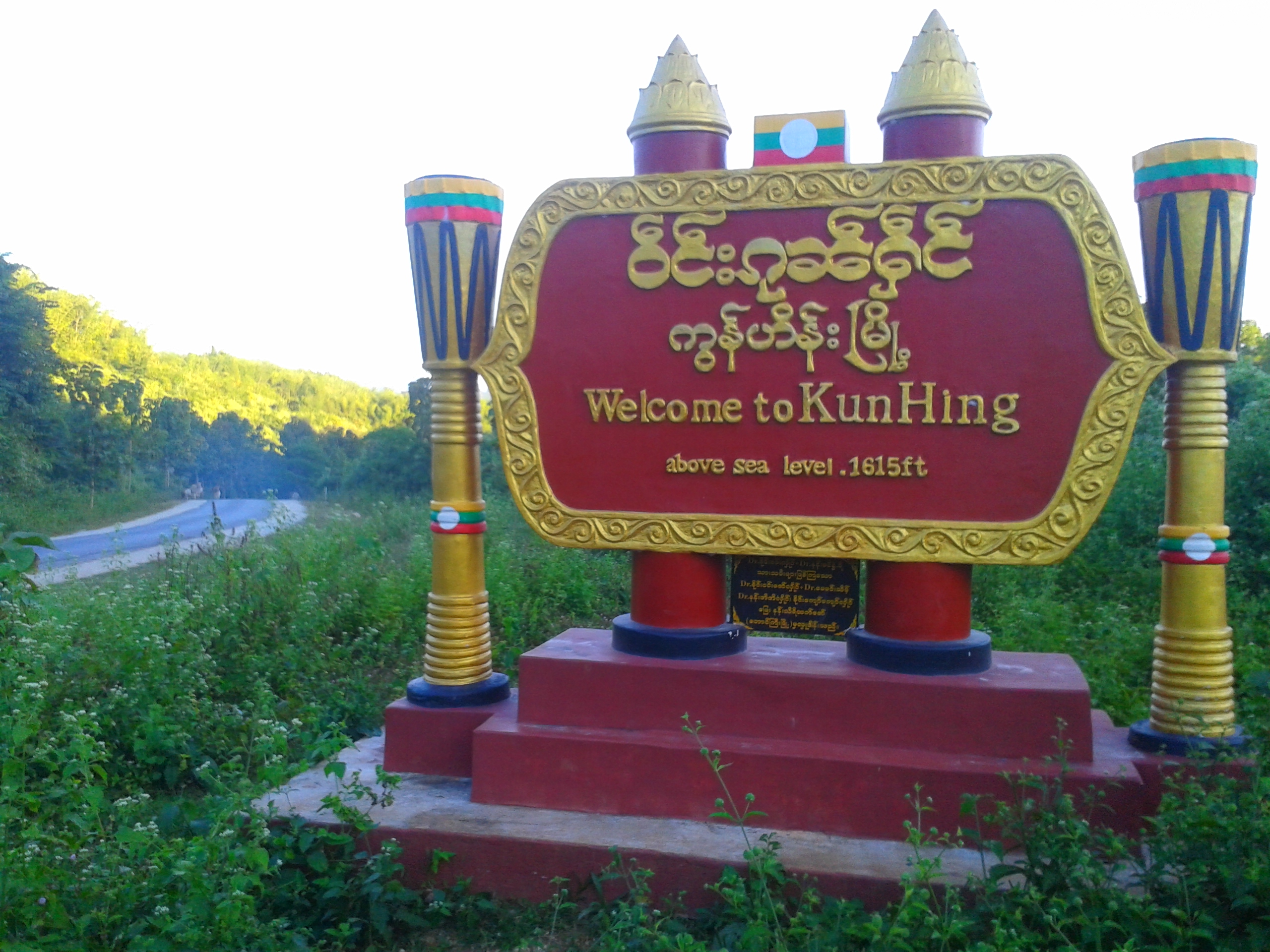

- Location in Burma
- Coordinates: 21°18′10″N 98°25′36″E
- Country: Myanmar
- State: Shan State
- District: Nansang District
- Township: Kunhing Township
- Elevation: 504 m (1,654 ft)
- Time zone: UTC+6.30 (MST)

Kunhing (also called Kunhein) is located in Kunhing Township in the middle part of southern Shan state, Myanmar. The name Kunhein refers to "a thousand island" in the local Shan language.

== Geographic ==
Kunhing is located by the Nam Pang River, an important tributary of the Salween.

== Population ==
As refers to 1983 census figures, it has less than 30,000 population; primarily Shans. Minorities are Akar, Lisu and Palaung.

== Places of interest ==
Kunhing Bridge – over 400 metres (1,300 ft) in length crossing over two big islands in the Nam Pang River. It is one of the main bridges on the Taunggyi-Kengtung Road.
