= Möng Küng =

Former Shan State in Burma

Coordinates: 21°36′N 97°31′E

- State of the Shan States
- 1835–1959
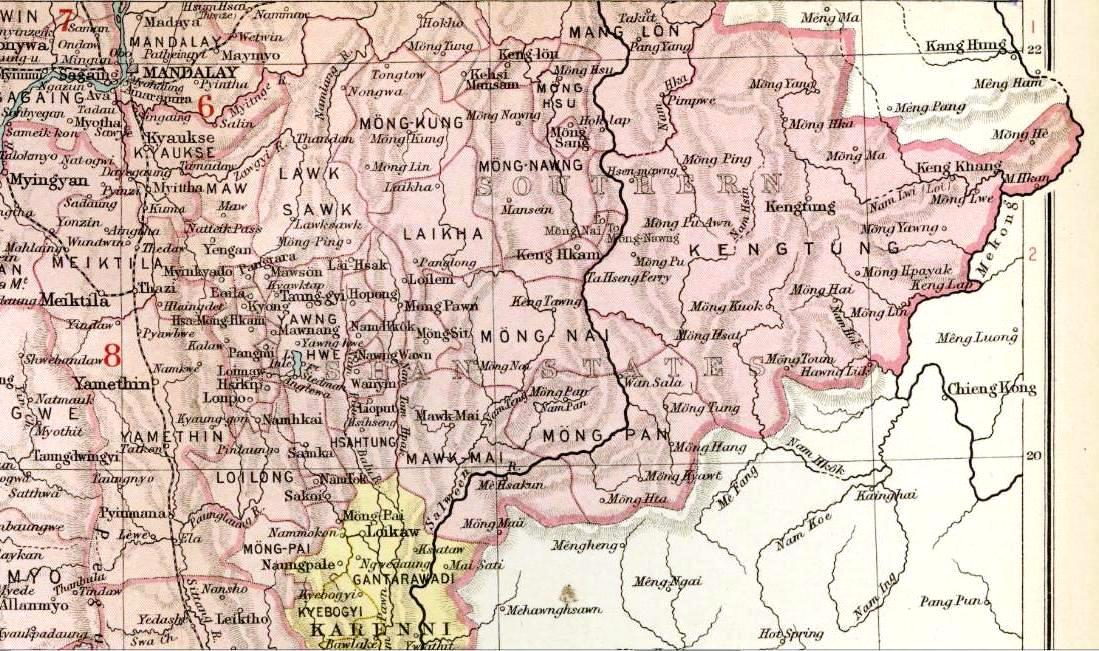
- Möng Küng State in an Imperial Gazetteer of India map
- Area
  - 1901: 2,650 km^{2} (1,020 sq mi)
- Population
  - 1901: 30,482
- History
  - State founded: 1835
  - Abdication of the last Saopha: 1959
Preceded by	Succeeded by
Hsenwi State	Shan State

Möng Küng, also known as Maingkaing (Burmese: မိုင်းကိုင်), was a Shan state in what is today Burma. It belonged to the Eastern Division of the Southern Shan States. Its capital was Mong Kung, in the valley of the Nam Teng. The largest minority were Palaung people.

== History ==
Möng Küng was founded in ancient times as Langkavadi. In 1835, after the British annexed Upper Burma and established their rule in the region, Möng Küng had been formerly a feudatory state of Hsenwi.

=== Rulers ===
The rulers of Möng Küng bore the title Myoza in 1835-54 and 1863–73; Saopha in 1854-63 and from 1873.

==== Saophas and Myozas ====
- 1835 - 1860 Hkun Long (d. 1860)
- 1860 - 1863 Hkun Long II
- 1863 - 1873 Gu Na (d. 1873)
- 1873 - 1879 Hkun San Kwan
- 1879 - .... Hkun Mong (b. 1873 - d. ....)
- 1879 - 1883 Heng Hkon Sang -Regent
