= Kunhing Township =

Kunhing ကွန်ဟိန်းမြို့နယ်
- Township
- Kun Hein Township
- Location in Nansang district
- Coordinates: 21°18′12″N 98°25′36″E
- Country: Myanmar
- State: Shan State
- District: Nansang District
- Capital: Kunhing
- Elevation: 504 m (1,654 ft)
- Time zone: UTC+6.30 (MMT)

Kunhing Township (Burmese: ကွန်ဟိန်းမြို့နယ် officially Kun Hein Township)is a township of Nansang District in the Shan State of Myanmar. The principal town is Kunhing.
