= Nam Pang River =

Location
- Country: Myanmar

Physical characteristics
- Source
  - location: Shan Hills NE of Pangkyehtu
- Mouth
  - location: Salween near Na-hkilek
  - coordinates: 20°57′18″N 98°30′01″E
  - elevation: 240 m (790 ft)

The Nam Pang River, also known as Pang River, is a major river of Shan State, eastern Burma. It is the largest tributary of the Salween River.

== Course ==
Its source is in the hills northeast of Pangkyehtu and it flows by the town of Kunhing.

The Nam Pang joins the Salween from the right at the village of Na-hkilek at 20°57′18″N 98°30′01″E at an elevation of 240 m (790 ft). A few miles beyond the confluence is said to be "a strange whirlpool, at the place the river is in a gorge between limestone cliffs, which fall smooth and precipitous to the water's edge."
