= Mong Nai Township =

Mong Nai Township မိုးနဲမြို့နယ် ၸႄႈဝဵင်းမိူင်းၼၢႆး Mo Ne Township
- Township
- Location in Nansang district
- Coordinates: 20°31′N 97°52′E
- Country: Burma
- State: Shan State
- District: Nansang District
- Capital: Mong Nai
- Time zone: UTC+6.30 (MMT)

Mong Nai Township (Burmese: မိုးနဲမြို့နယ်, Shan: ၸႄႈဝဵင်းမိူင်းၼၢႆး) is a township of Nansang District in the Shan State of Myanmar. The main town is Mong Nai, the capital of the historical Mongnai State. The primary agricultural products of the area are rice and sugar.
