= Möng Nai =

Former Shan state in Burma

Coordinates: 20°31′N 97°52′E

- State of the Shan States
- 1318–1959
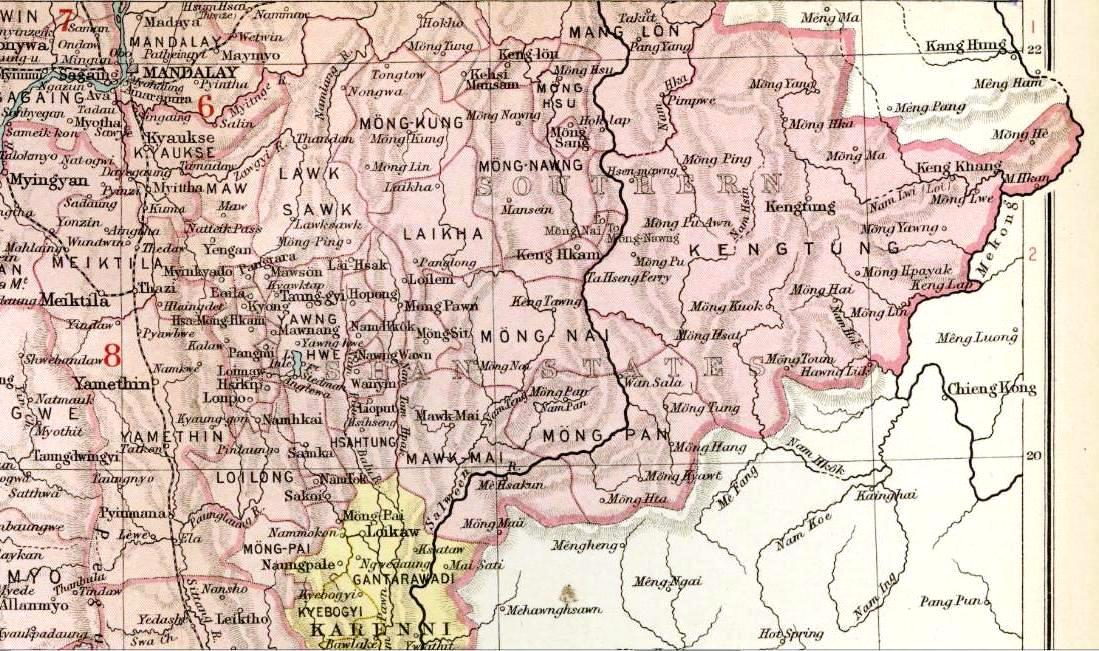
- Möng Nai in an Imperial Gazetteer of India map
- Capital: Möng Nai
- Area
  - 1901: 5,129 km^{2} (1,980 sq mi)
- Population
  - 1901: 44,252
- History
  - State founded: 1318
  - Abdication of the last Saopha: 1959
| Succeeded by |
| Shan State |

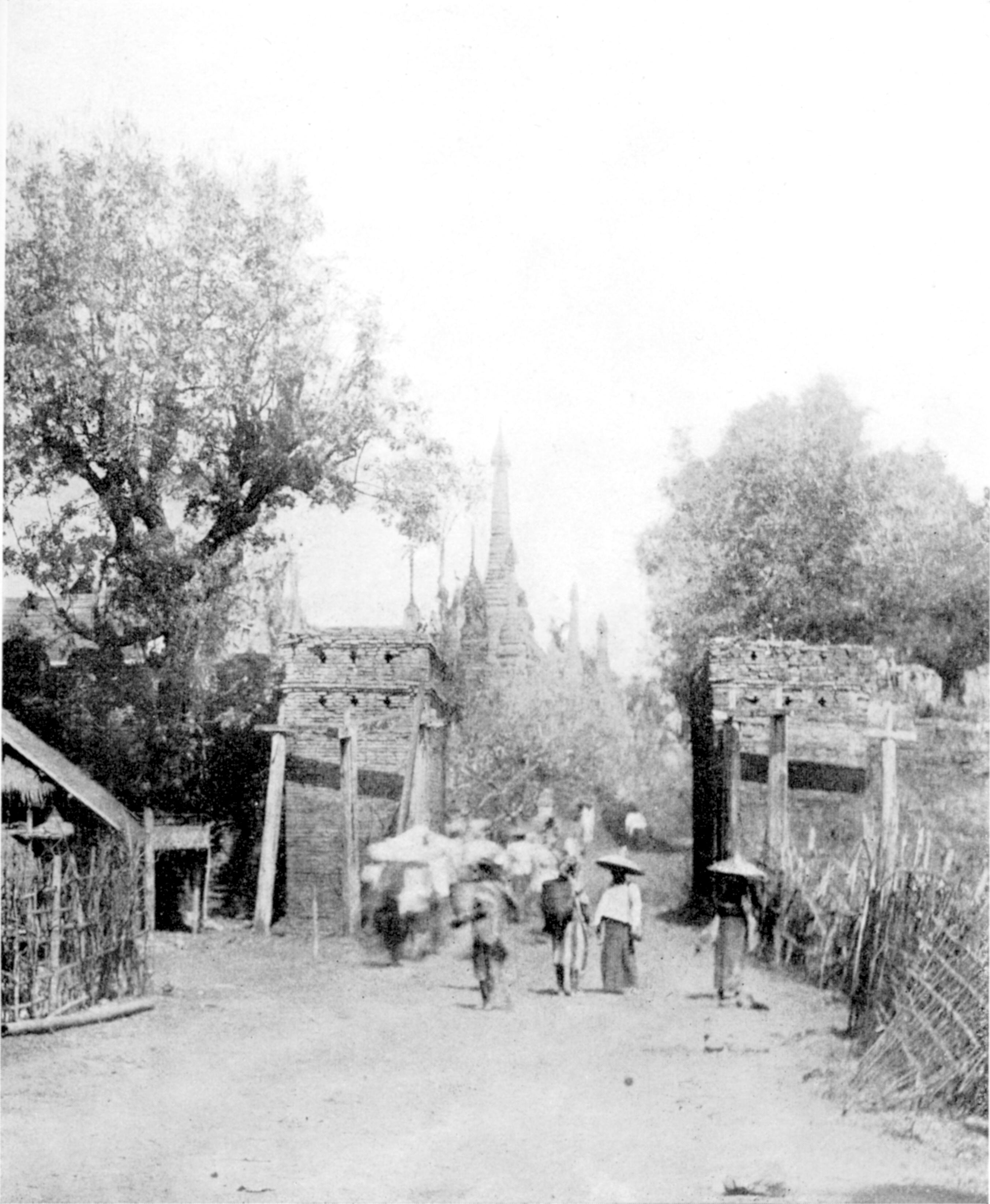
The Gate at Mongnai in a picture by Sir James George Scott.

Möng Nai, also known as Mone, was a Shan state in what is today Burma. It belonged to the Eastern Division of the Southern Shan States. Its capital was the town of Möng Nai.

== History ==
Möng Nai was founded in 1223 or 1318. Northern Thai chronicles claim that the state was founded in 1318 by Khun Khüa, a son of Mangrai, and ruled as a vassal state of Lan Na in the coming centuries. However, Shan histories claim that it was conquered by Sam Long Hpa in 1223, and a branch of the "old Möng Mi line" were put in charge of the state as tributaries of Möng Mao. The native records of the state were lost in various fires.

The state's ritual name was Saturambha.

In later centuries, Möng Nai included the substates of Kengtawng and Kenghkam. The latter was annexed in 1882.

=== Rulers (title Myoza) ===
- c. 1802 – 1848: Maung Shwe Paw
- 1848–1850: Maung Yit
- 1850–1851: U Po Ka
- 1852: U Shwe Kyu

== Saophas ==
Ritual style Kambawsa Rahta Mahawunthiri Pawara Thudamaraza.

| # | Begin | End | Saophas | Details |
|---|---|---|---|---|
| 1 | 1312 | 1339 | Hkun Hkue | Son of King Mangrai |
| 2 | 1339 | 1364 | Ngoen Hkoeng Hpa (Hkun Htoeng) | Son of Hkun Hkue |
| 3 | 1364 | 1384 | Ngoen Htap Hpa (Yawt Hkam Hsen) | Son of Ngoen Hkoeng Hpa |
| 4 | 1384 | 1404 | Ngoen Yap Hpa | Son of Ngoen Htap Hpa |
| 5 | 1404 | 1434 | Ngoen Kawn Hpa | Son of Ngoen Hom Hpa |
| 6 | 1434 | 1472 | Ngoen Pawng Hpa | Son of Ngoen Kawn Hpa |
| 7 | 1472 | 1476 | Ngoen Hsawng Hpa | Younger brother of Ngoen Pawng Hpa |
| 8 | 1476 | 1479 | Ngoen Din Hpa | Son of Ngoen Pawng Hpa |
| 9 | 1479 | 1492 | Ngeon Mawk Hpa | Son of Ngoen Hsawng Hpa |
| 10 | 1479 | 1516 | Ngeon Htawt Hpa | Son of Ngoen Mawk Hpa |
| 11 | 1516 | 1532 | Sao Htap Hkam | Younger brother of Ngeon Htawt Hpa |
| 12 | 1532 | 1542 | Ngeon Aung Hpa | Son of Ngeon Htawt Hpa |
| 13 | 1542 | 1567 | Hso Pak Hpa | Son of Sao Hkun Möng of Oung Pawng |
| 14 | 1567 | 1586 | Hso Piam Hpa | Son of Hso Pak Hpa |
| 15 | 1586 | 1599 | Hso Pap Hpa | Younger brother of Hso Piam Hpa |
| 16 | 1599 | 1612 | Hso Yew Hpa | Son of Hso Piam Hpa |
| 17 | 1612 | 1620 | Hso Ngam Hpa | Son of Hso Pap Hpa |
| 18 | 1620 | 1631 | Sao Möng Hkam | Son of Hso Ngam Hpa |
| 19 | 1631 | 1675 | Sao Hla Hkam | Son of Hso Piam Hpa of Mongmit |
| 20 | 1675 | 1678 | Sao Kyam Hkam | Son of Sao Hla Hkam |
| 21 | 1678 | 1704 | Hso Hom Hpa | Son of Sao Kyam Hkam |
| 22 | 1704 | 1728 | Hso Hat Hpa | Son of Hso Hom Hpa |
| 23 | 1728 | 1746 | Shwe Hkat Hpa | Son of Hso Hat Hpa |
| 24 | 1746 | 1772 | Shwe Naw Hpa - (Shwe Myat Noe) | Son of Sao Shwe Hkat Hpa |
| 25 | 1772 | 1790 | Shwe Marn Hpa - (Shwe Myat Kyaw) | Son of Shwe Naw Hpa |
| 26 | 1790 | 1811 | Shwe Sone Hpa | Son of Shwe Marn Hpa |
| 27 | 1811 | 1842 | Hkun Hsen Kyung | Son of Shwe Sone Hpa, Ex Saopha of Kyaingtong |
| 28 | 1842 | 1868 | Hkun Nu Nom | Son of Hkun Hsen Kyung |
| 29 | 1868 | 1874 | Hkun Hpo On | Son of Hkun Nu Nom |
| 30 | 1874 | 1884 | Sao Hswe Kyi — 1st time | The uncle of Hkun Hpo On |
| 31 | 1884 | 1888 | Twet Nga Lu | Usurper from Kyaingtong the Pa Oh Ex-monk. Died 1888 |
| 30² | 1888 | 1914 | Sao Hswe Kyi — 2nd time | The uncle of Hkun Hpo On |
| 32 | 1914 | 1928 | Hkun Kyaw Sam | Son of Sao Hswe Kyi, Enthrone on 6 May 1914 |
| 33 | 1929 | 1948 | Hkun Kyaw Haw | Son of Hkun Kyaw Sam |
| 34 | 1948 | 1959 | Sao Pyea | Son of Hkun Kyaw Haw, The last Saopha |
