= Loilen District =

Loilen လွိုင်လင်ခရိုင်
- District
- Loilen district in Shan State
- Coordinates: 20°55′30″N 97°33′15″E
- Country: Myanmar
- State: Shan State
- Capital: Loilen
- Elevation: 1,352 m (4,436 ft)
- Time zone: UTC+6.30 (MMT)

Loilen District (Burmese: လွိုင်လင်ခရိုင်, also romanised as Loilem District) is a district in central Shan State, Myanmar. In 2010, it consisted of 9 towns and 7 townships. In 2022, most of its townships were split off to form new districts, leaving it with only three townships. Its capital is Loilem.

== Townships ==
Townships of Loilem District Laihka Loilem Mongkung

The District has three townships- Loilem Township, Lai-Hka Township and Mong Kung Township. Prior to 2022, the district contained seven other townships- Nansang Township, Kunhing Township, Kyethi Township and Mong Hsu Township of which two were split off to form the new Mong Hsu District and the other two formed part of the new Nansang District alongside Mong Nai Township from former Langkho District.

In 2010, Mong Pan Township was moved under Langkho District.
