= Nansang District =

District in Shan State, Myanmar

Nan San District နမ့်စန်ခရိုင်
- Nansang District (Red) in Shan State
- Coordinates: 21.204°N 98.194°E
- Country: Myanmar
- Region: Shan State
- Capital: Nansang
- Time zone: MMT

Nansang District (Burmese: နမ့်စန်ခရိုင်) is a district in central Shan State, Myanmar. It was split from Loilen District and Langkho District on 30 April 2022. It contains three townships. Its district seat is Nansang.

== Townships ==
Nansang District has 3 townships, each with one subtownship of their own:

- Nansang Township
  - Kholam Subtownship
- Kunhing Township
  - Karli Subtownship
- Mong Nai Township
  - Keng Tawng Subtownship
