= United Wa State Army =

Ethnic armed organisation in Myanmar

- Kru' Naing' Rob Rom' Hak Tiex Praog 佤邦联合军 ဝပြည် သွေးစည်းညီညွတ်ရေး တပ်မတော်
- Flag of the United Wa State Army
- Leader: Bao Youxiang
- Dates active: 17 April 1989 – present
- Headquarters: Pangkham, Myanmar
- Active regions: Wa State
- Ideology: Wa nationalism Ethno-nationalism; Communism; Marxism-Leninism; Maoism
- Size: 30,000
- Part of: United Wa State Party
- Wars: the internal conflict in Myanmar

The United Wa State Army (Parauk: Kru' Naing' Rob Rom' Hak Tiex Praog, simplified Chinese: 佤邦联合军; traditional Chinese: 佤邦聯合軍; pinyin: Wǎbāng Liánhéjūn; Burmese: ဝပြည် သွေးစည်းညီညွတ်ရေး တပ်မတော်, IPA: [wa̰ pjì θwésí ɲìɲʊʔjé taʔmədɔ̀]), abbreviated as the UWSA or the UWS Army, is the military wing of the United Wa State Party (UWSP), the de facto ruling party of Wa State (officially known as the Wa Self-Administered Division) in Myanmar. It is a well-equipped ethnic minority army of an estimated 20,000–30,000 Wa soldiers, led by Bao Youxiang. The UWSA was formed after the collapse of the armed wing of the Communist Party of Burma (CPB) in 1989.

The UWSA announced its territory as the "Wa State Government Special Administrative Region" on 1 January 2009. The de facto President is Bao Youxiang Although the Government of Myanmar does not officially recognise the sovereignty of Wa State, the Tatmadaw (Myanmar Armed Forces) has frequently allied with the UWSA to fight against Shan nationalist militia groups, such as the Shan State Army (RCSS).

Despite being de facto independent from Myanmar, the Wa State officially recognizes Myanmar's sovereignty over all of its territory. In 1989 the two parties signed a ceasefire agreement, and in 2013 signed a peace deal. As the largest non-state armed group in Myanmar, it has effectively led the Federal Political Negotiation and Consultative Committee (FPNCC) since 2017, representing nearly every pre-2021 non-ceasefire signatory armed groups. In not seeking independence or secession, UWSA is unlike most of the ethnic armed organizations in Myanmar.

== History ==
On 17 April 1989, ethnic Wa soldiers, under the command of Wei Sai-tang, the 417th, 412th, and 418th Battalions seized control of Panghsang (Bang Kang). The operation resulted in the capture and expulsion of the chairman of the Communist Party of Burma and marked the end of the party’s rule in the region. The United Wa State Party was formed as a merger of the Burma National United Party and the non-communist Wa National Council in November 1989, following the CPB mutiny in spring of 1989.

The UWSA is supported by China, who gives the UWSA more support than to the Myanmar government.

Until 1996 the United Wa State Army was involved in a conflict against the Shan Mong Tai Army led by drug kingpin Khun Sa which suited the objectives of the Tatmadaw in the area. During this conflict the Wa army occupied areas close to the Thai border, ending up with the control of two separate swathes of territory north and south of Kengtung. UWSA is one of the 17 armed ceased fire groups that attended long National Convention orchestrated by Myanmar military. In 1990s the Wa Women's Association established an orphanage in Pangkham for children's whose parents were killed in fighting between UWSA and Shan forces.

In August 2009, the United Wa State Army became involved in the Kokang incident, a violent conflict with Burma's military junta's Myanmar Armed Forces (Tatmadaw). This was the largest outbreak of fighting between ethnic armies and government troops since the signing of the ceasefire 20 years earlier. Myanmar signed a peace deal with the UWSA in 2013 in the leadup to the Nationwide Ceasefire Agreement (NCA). However, the UWSA did not sign the NCA in 2015.

In April 2017, China helped the UWSA establish a seven-member alliance called the Federal Political Negotiation and Consultative Committee (FPNCC), after the demise of another alliance, the United Nationalities Federal Council, in the wake of the NCA. Today, the UWSA maintains close links with FPNCC partners like the Myanmar National Democratic Alliance Army (MNDAA), the Ta'ang Army and the Arakan Army. The MNDAA is a Kokang CPB splinter group and both the Ta'ang Army and the Arakan Army fought alongside the MNDAA in Kokang in 2015. These three groups, among others, receive Chinese weapons from the UWSA either as gifts or purchases.

The United Wa State Army also works with the ULFA-ATF, an Assam resistance group which launches attacks in India through mobile bases in Myanmar. In November 2023, the UWSA vowed to use force against armed incursions from both sides in the Myanmar civil war after Wa State was declared a neutral zone.

Tensions between the UWSA and Thailand increased in November 2024 over alleged encroachment on Thai border territory.

On 20 August 2025, the UWSA declared that they would no longer provide weapons or financial aid to the TNLA, MNDAA, and Shan State Army - North. Speculation arose that the UWSA's announcement, combined with Tatmadaw offenses in Shan State contributed to a rise of weapon prices for anti-junta guerrillas.

== Leadership ==
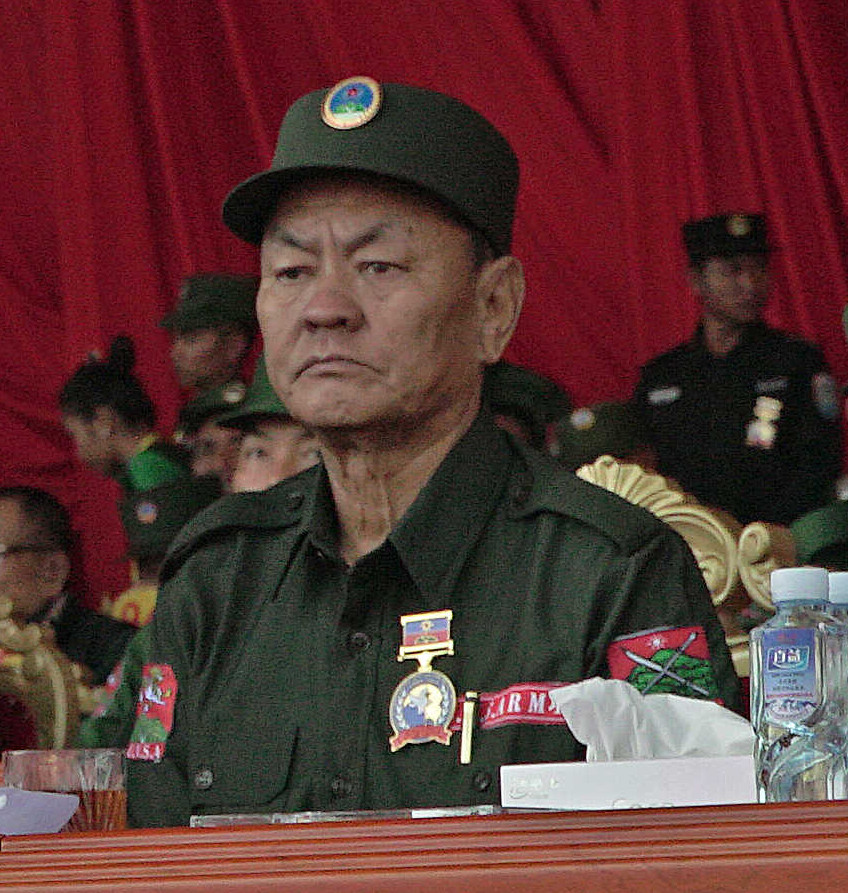
Bao Youxiang, Commander-in-Chief of UWSA

The Burma National United Party (BNUP) and, later, the United Wa State Army (UWSA) was founded and led by Chao Ngi Lai, also spelt as Zhao Nyi-lai. After his stroke in 1995, Bao Youxiang, the military commander of the UWSA, took over leadership, while Chao remained the General-Secretary of the United Wa State Party (UWSP) until he died at the age of 70 in 2009. Ai Xiaoxue, as the founder of the Wa National Council (WNC), was also instrumental in the merger establishing the UWSA with the BNUP. He formed the WNC with Maha Hsang Wiang Ngeun, his brother-in-law, in 1984. His group was the nucleus of UWSA's 171 Military Region near the Thai border. He died at the age of 78 in Mandalay on 29 October 2011. Today, Bao Youxiang remains the Commander-in-Chief, running the UWSA with his brothers Bao Youyi and Bao Youliang. Youyi, who became the deputy-general secretary of the UWSP in 2005, holds an important position in the army. Youliang manages the headquarters of the northern Wa hills in Möng Mao.

The first Deputy Commander-in-Chief was Li Ziru, an ethnically Chinese former Red Guard volunteer. He remained with the CPB through the 1970s when many Chinese CPB members returned to China and eventually joined the UWSA serving until his death in 2005. It is plausible that Li and other ethnic Chinese remained in the CPB splinter groups because China wanted to maintain influence even after the mutiny of 1989. The group's Deputy Commander-in-Chief today is Zhao Zhongdang. In 2022, due to the advanced age of both Bao Youxiang and Zhao, Bao Youxiang's nephew Bao Ai Chan was promoted to be Deputy Commander-in-Chief alongside Zhao, who retains his position. The 2022 reshuffle will not largely change the administration and leadership of the UWSA, but signals a lesson learnt from the 1989 CPB leadership crises.

The foreign affairs spokesperson role that Li Ziru played has been taken over by Zhao Guoan, another ethnically Chinese veteran. He took part in the Union Peace Conference – 21st Century Panglong peace talks in 2017 and 2018. Although he is from Yunnan, he was the only delegate comfortable speaking Burmese among the ethnic armies.

In October 2023, Deputy Commander-in-Chief Bao Ai Chan was arrested while in China, in a string of arrests and extraditions relating to over 1,000 Chinese citizens involved in cyber scams in connection with Wa State. The UWSA has reportedly appointed a successor but does not comment on the arrest.

== Territory ==
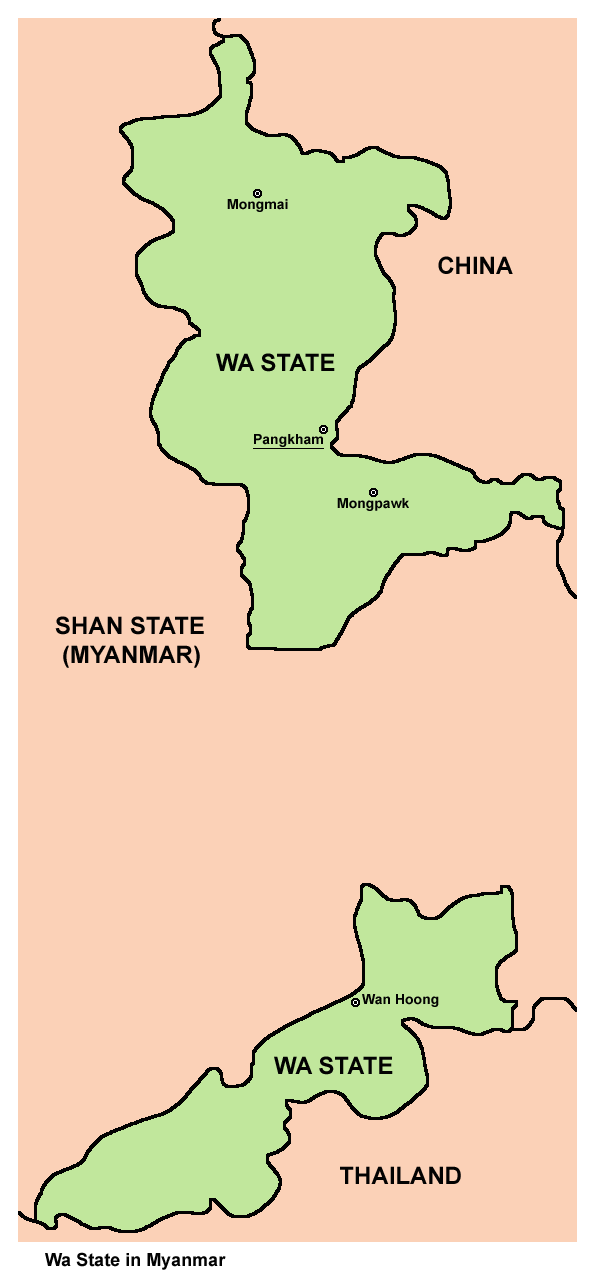
Areas under the control of the UWSA in 2015. The southern sector is not part of the traditional Wa territory but granted in 1989 by the then Burmese government for UWSA's cooperation in the war against Khun Sa.

The towns of Pangkham and Mong Pawk are within the area of this special region. The UWSA negotiated a ceasefire agreement with the Burmese military in the 1990s, and currently backs a counterinsurgency strategy of the Myanmar Army against the Shan State Army (RCSS) (RCSS/SSA). The UWSA defied the military regime's recent demand to disarm and participate in the 2010 elections, and instead proposed to declare the territory under their control as a special autonomous region.

According to 2008 constitution, six townships are designated as the Wa Self-Administered Division. Those are Mongmao, Pangwaun, Namphan, Pangkham (Pangsang), Hopang and Matman Township. Although Mong Pawk is not part of it, but part of Mong Yang Township, the UWSA was strongly against to give away that area from its control because it serves as a link with its ally, the National Democratic Alliance Army (NDAA) in Mongla. Matman are not under UWSA control. UWSA announced its territory as Wa State Government Special Administrative Region in January 2009.

== Business operations ==
The ceasefire agreement allowed the United Wa State Army to freely expand their logistical operations with the Burmese military, including the trafficking of drugs to neighbouring Thailand and Laos. The Wa have used revenue generated from the sale of drugs to finance political and economic goals, like weapons and hospitals.

=== Illicit business ===
Using commercial concessions granted through favorable relations with General Khin Nyut, the UWSA operated illicit enterprises in the 1990s via affiliated businesspeople and enterprises.

==== Drug trafficking ====
In August 1990, government officials began drafting a plan to end drug production and trafficking in Wa State. According to an interview with Wa officials in 1994, Bao Youyi (Tax Kuad Rang; also known as Bao Youyu) became wanted by the Chinese police for his involvement in drug trafficking. As a result, Bao Youxiang and Zhao Nyi-Lai went to Cangyuan Va Autonomous County of China and signed the Cangyuan Agreement with local officials, which stated that, "No drugs will go into the international society (from Wa State); no drugs will go into China (from Wa State); no drugs will go into Burmese government-controlled areas (from Wa State)." However, the agreement did not mention whether or not Wa State could sell drugs to insurgent groups.

In 1997, the United Wa State Party officially proclaimed that Wa State would be drug-free by the end of 2005. With the help of the United Nations and the Chinese government, many opium farmers in Wa State shifted to the production of rubber and tea. However, some poppy farmers continued to cultivate the flower outside of Wa State.

The United States government Drug Enforcement Administration labelled the UWSA as a narcotic trafficking organisation on 29 May 2003. On 3 November 2005, The Department of the Treasury's Office of Foreign Assets Control listed 11 individuals and 16 companies that were "part of the financial and commercial network of designated significant foreign narcotics trafficker Wei Hsueh-kang and the United Wa State Army (UWSA)." The UWSA is said to be the largest drug-producing organisation in Southeast Asia. The UWSP on its part blamed both the Ne Win military government and the CPB for using the Wa as "pawns in the violent destructive games" and encouraging them to grow the opium poppy.

The opium poppy harvest had increased since the former drug baron and warlord Lo Hsing Han managed to rebuild his drug empire after he became the intermediary for ceasefire agreements between the military intelligence chief Khin Nyunt and the Kokang and Wa insurgents who had rebelled against and toppled the Communist leadership in 1989. In addition to the traditional Golden Triangle export of opiates, production has diversified to methamphetamine, or yaa baa, which is cheaper and easier to manufacture than heroin. Thai authorities have denounced methamphetamine production, trafficking, and consumption as a threat to national security. It denied involvement in the Mekong incident of 5 November 2011.

Poppy cultivation has declined in both northern Laos and the Wa region partly as a result of a ban imposed by the UWSP in 2005. In 1999, Bao Youxiang ordered a forced relocation, away from the poppy fields, of six northern Wa districts south to mainly Shan and Lahu areas. The World Food Programme (WFP) and China also provided emergency food assistance to former poppy farmers. Chinese criminal organisations in the area however may have simply switched the production line from heroin to amphetamine-type stimulants (ATS) such as yaa baa.

=== Mining operations ===
Chinese companies with close links to the UWSA have unregulated mining operations in UWSA-controlled territory, which has caused significant toxic pollution in Thailand's rivers, including the tributaries of the Mekong, representing Thailand's "largest-ever case of transboundary pollution." Arsenic levels in water tests conducted in Chiang Mai and Chiang Rai have detected arsenic levels five times higher than international drinking water standards.

=== Other operations ===
Wei Hsueh-kang founded the Hong Pang Group in 1998 with revenues from the drug trade after taking advantage of the privileges offered in the ceasefire deal by Khin Nyunt. Its position in the country's economy, not just the Wa State, is reflected by the multitude of businesses it owns and controls in construction, agriculture, gems and minerals, petroleum, electronics and communications, distilleries and department stores. Hong Pang Group is based at Pangkham with offices also in Yangon, Mandalay, Lashio, Tachilek and Mawlamyine and minor bases in Sankang and Khailong. UWSA also operated its own bank in the past.

Ho Chun Ting (also known as Aik Haw and Hsiao Haw), the son-in-law of Bao Youxiang, is the principal owner and managing director of Yangon Airways and chairman of Tetkham Co Ltd that runs a chain of hotels. Close to Khin Nyunt and several other generals in the junta, he was also involved in gems auctions and several large construction projects with the Yangon City Development Council. He was reported to have fled to Pangkham following the arrest of his known associates in a drug-related offence in January 2009. Aik Haw was included in the Specially Designated Nationals and Blocked Persons List published by the US Treasury's Office of Foreign Assets Control on 25 November 2008.

Despite publicly declaring neutrality, the UWSA allegedly supplies weapons (with the exception of MANPADS) to anti-Junta groups such as the Three Brotherhood Alliance.

== Relationship with China ==
UWSA has benefited from long-standing political and military ties to China, and has a close relationship with China's security agencies. Most significantly, this provides China leverage inside Burma allowing it to push other issues like the Sino-Myanmar pipelines. Beijing's official delegate is only one layer of its approach to diplomacy with not just the central government but also the various ethnic armies along the China–Myanmar border. China's involvement in the UWSA's peace process aims to create stability for its multiple large infrastructure investments and keep its natural resource trade across the border protected.

The Chinese government uses former CPB forces like UWSA as proxies within Burma, and works to ensure the drugs they produce are not smuggled into China. Wa State has benefited from substantial Chinese tourism, turning Mong La into a Chinese tourist hub. China also helped the UWSA establish themselves as the de facto leaders of the FPNCC. The Chinese also supply military hardware, arms, and training to the UWSA.

Despite this, the Chinese Communist Party has pressured the UWSA to stop supplying weapons to northern EAOs, as Beijing seeks to legitimize the current Burmese regime in the international community.

== Deployment ==
The United Wa State Army (UWSA) has five "divisions" deployed along the Thai-Burma border:

1. 778th Division commanded by Ta Marn
2. 772nd Division commanded by Ta Hsong
3. 775th Division commanded by Yang Guojong
4. 248th Division commanded by Ta Hsang
5. 518th Division commanded by Li Hsarm-nab

On the China-Burma border are stationed another three "divisions":

1. 318th Division
2. 418th Division
3. 468th Division

The United Wa State Army has 30,000 active service men with a 10,000 strong auxiliary force. It is one of the largest ceasefire groups. Monthly salary is only 60 CNY (US$7.5). UWSA had clashes with the Thai Army in Mar–May 2002.

=== Arms supply ===
According to Jane's Intelligence Review in April 2008, China has become the main source of arms to the United Wa State Army, displacing traditional black market sources in Southeast Asia such as Thailand and Cambodia. Arms transfers to the UWSA from China are directed from the highest level in Beijing.

Jane's reported in 2001 that the UWSA had acquired HN-5N surface-to-air missiles (SAMs) from China as part of the build-up near the Thai border where they were reported to be operating 40–50 laboratories manufacturing yaa baa. In November 2014, Jane's further reported that the UWSA have acquired the FN-6 surface-to-air missile to supplant the HN-5N in service, which was promptly denied by the UWSA. It is also the middleman between Chinese arms manufacturers and other insurgent groups in Myanmar. By 2012, Chinese support had increased to the point of supplying armoured vehicles such as the 6 × 6 PTL-02 assault gun being sighted in Pangkham.

On 29 April 2013, Jane's IHS reported that several Mil Mi-17 helicopters armed with TY-90 air-to-air missiles were supplied to UWSA by China. The allegations were dismissed by China, Thai military sources, other Myanmar ethnic sources and the UWSA themselves. In 2015 IHS Jane's reported that UWSA members had been photographed training with Chinese Type 96 122 mm howitzers and HJ-8 ATGMs.

A Jane's report in December 2008 stated that the UWSA had turned to arms production to supplement their income from arms and drug trafficking, and started a small arms production line for AK-47s.

=== Conscription policies ===
The UWSA requires that at least one male in each household serve in either the UWSA or Wa State administration. Larger families are obligated to provide two males for the army or administration.

== Gallery ==
UWSP/UWSA
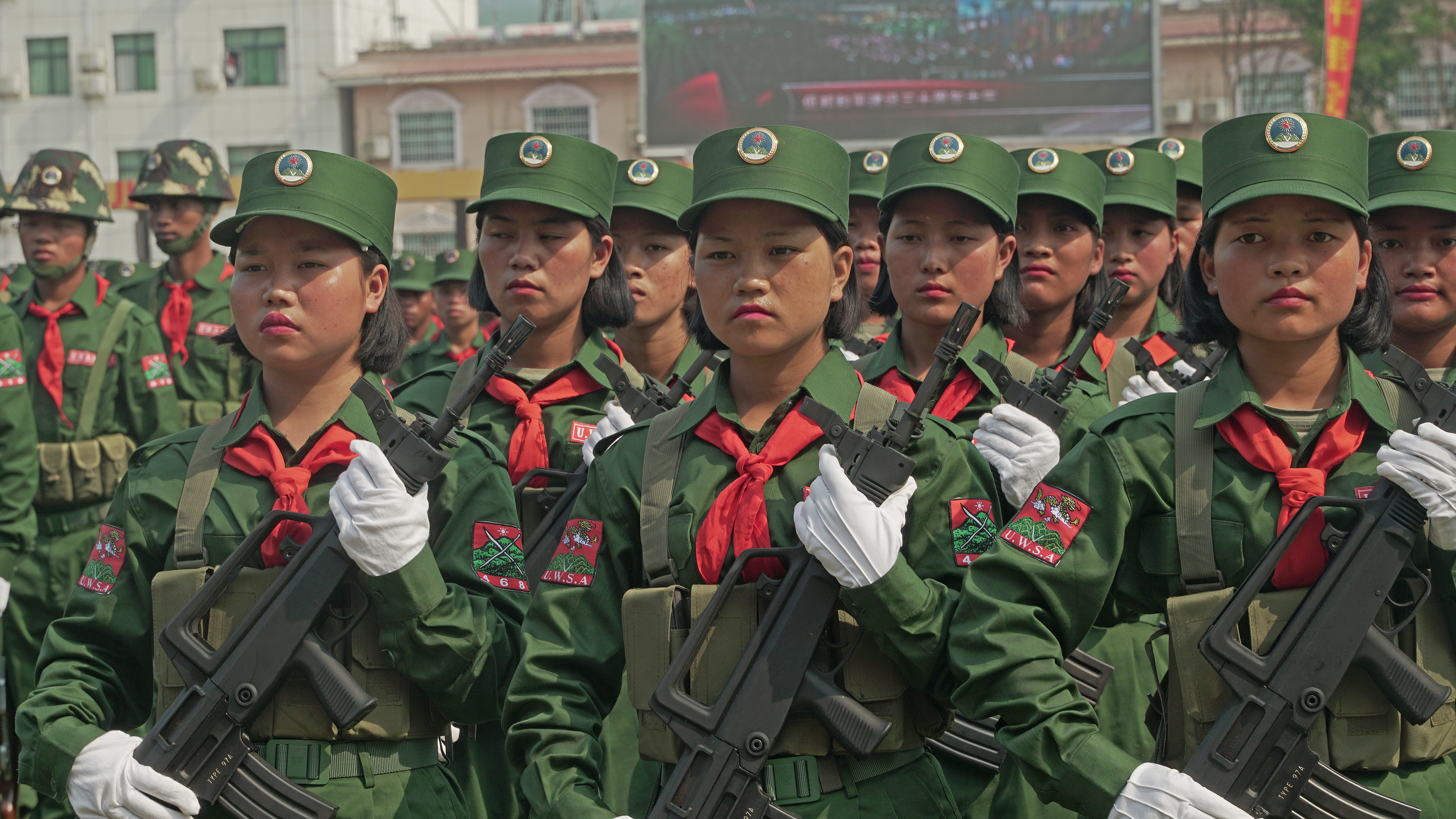
UWSA female soldiers stand at attention during ceremonies

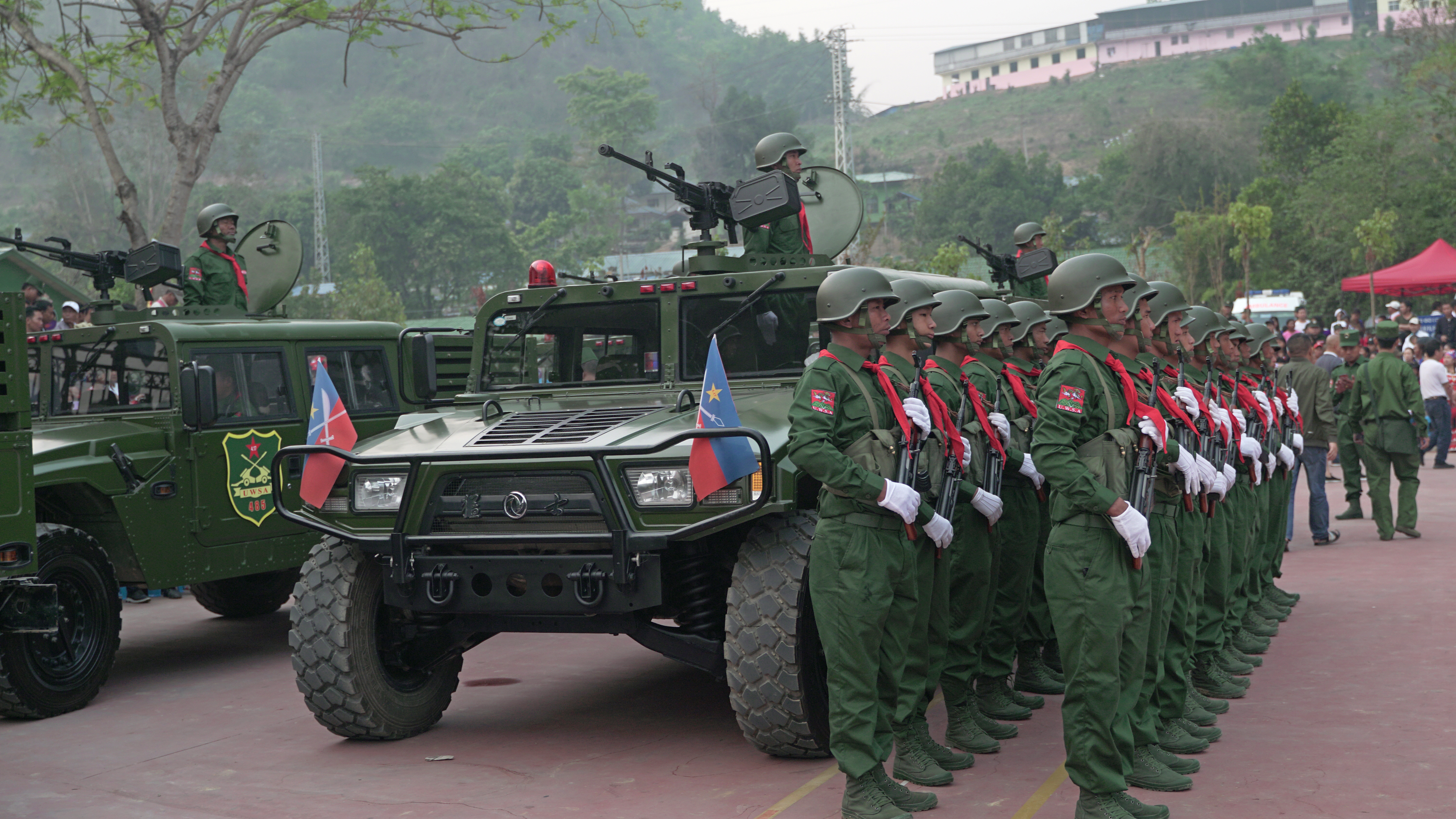
UWSA soldiers stand at attention during ceremonies
