= Kunma =

Kunma Taoh Mie
- Location in Myanmar (Burma)
- Coordinates: 22.979°N 99.46°E
- Country: Myanmar
- Division: Wa SAD (de jure); Wa State (de facto)
- Township (de jure) County (de facto): Mong Maoe
- Time zone: UTC+6.30 (MMT)

Kunma (Chinese transcription of Dai: 昆马), known in Wa as Taoh Mie (lit. "source of the Mie River"; Mandarin: 格迈) and in Burmese as Hkun Mar (ခွန်းမား), is a town in the Wa Self-Administered Division, Shan State, Myanmar. It is de facto administered by Wa State.

The town has a diverse population of Bamar, Kokang, Panthay and Wa residents.

== Administration ==
Under the Wa State, Myanmar, the Taoh Mie District is subdivided into

- Taoh Mie Township (Wa: daux eeng Taoh Mie; Mandarin: 昆马乡，"到蔑"),
- Taoh Saoh Township,
- Man Raix Township,
- Man Rai Township,
- Yaong Lhai Township,
- Gawng Goeh Township,
- Yaong Ting Township,
- Yaong Tu Township,
- Dongxing (Tong Sing) Township, and
- Yaong Noung Township

All above names except for Dongxing are in the Wa language.

Under the Tatmadaw, Kunma has town (မြို့) status.

== Notable people ==
- Bao Youxiang, commander-in-chief of the United Wa State Army
