= Wa State =

De facto independent state in Myanmar

Wa State ဝပြည်နယ် (Burmese) Meung Vax (Wa) 佤邦 (Chinese)
- Flags Emblem
- Anthem: Aux muih Meung Vax (Wa); 我爱佤邦 (Chinese); "I Love The Wa State"
- Claimed territory (green) within Myanmar (dark grey)
- Status: Autonomous self-governing polity (de jure); Independent state (de facto)
- Capital: Pangkham; 22°10′N 99°11′E
- Largest city: Mong Pawk
- Official languages: Standard Chinese, Wa, Burmese
- Recognised national languages: Wa
- Recognised regional languages: Southwestern Mandarin; Dai
- Working language: Standard Chinese
- Ethnic groups: Wa, Hui (Panthay), Han Chinese, Dai, Lahu, Akha, and others
- Government: Maoist communist state
  - President: Bao Youxiang
  - Vice President: Zhao Guo-an, Lau Yaku
  - Chairman of WPPCC: Zhao Ai Dao

History
  - Formation of the UWSP and UWSA: 17 April 1989
  - Ceasefire between the UWSA and the Tatmadaw: 9 May 1989
  - Creation of the Wa Self-Administered Division: 20 August 2010

Area
  - Total: 30,000 km^{2} (12,000 sq mi)

Population
  - Estimate: ~758,000 (total); 558,000 (northern area); 200,000 (southern area)
  - Density: 32.8/km^{2} (85.0/sq mi)
- GDP (PPP): 2022 estimate
  - Total: $10.08 billion
- HDI (2022): 0.552
- Currency: Renminbi (north); Thai baht (south)
- Time zone: UTC+06:30 (MMT)
- Calling code: +86 (0)879 (north) +66 (0)53 (south)

Wa State (Note: Parauk: Meung Pa-Raog or Meung Vax; Chinese: 佤邦; pinyin: Wǎ Bāng; Wade–Giles: Wa³ Pang¹; Burmese: ဝပြည်နယ်) is a de facto independent state and de jure self-governing region in Myanmar that has its own political system, administrative divisions and army. While the Wa State government recognises Myanmar's sovereignty over all of its territory, this does not include allegiance to any specific government. The 2008 Constitution of Myanmar officially recognises the northern part of Wa State as the Wa Self-Administered Division of Shan State. It is run as a de facto communist state ruled by the United Wa State Party (UWSP), which split from the Communist Party of Burma (CPB) in 1989. Wa State is divided into three counties, two special districts, and one economic development zone. The administrative capital is Pangkham, formerly known as Pangsang. The name Wa is derived from the Wa ethnic group, who speak an Austroasiatic language.

== History ==
For a long time, Wa tribes were dispersed around the Wa mountainous area, with no unified governance and gradually the region became separated from the tribal military control of the Dai people. British rule in Burma did not administer the Wa States and the border with China was left undefined.

From the late 1940s, during the Chinese Civil War, remnants of the Chinese National Revolutionary Army retreated to territory within Burma as the communists took over mainland China. Within the mountain region Kuomintang forces of the Eighth Army 237 division and 26th Army 93 division held their position for two decades in preparation for a counterattack towards mainland China. Under pressure from the United Nations, the counterattack was cancelled and the army was recalled to northern Thailand and later back to Taiwan; however, some troops decided to remain within Burma. East of the Salween river, indigenous tribal guerrilla groups exercised control with the support of the Communist Party of Burma.

During the 1960s, the Communist Party of Burma lost its base of operations within central Burma, and with the assistance of the Chinese communists, expanded within the border regions in the northeast. Many intellectual youths from China joined the Communist Party of Burma, and these forces also absorbed many local guerrillas. The Burmese communists gained control over Pangkham, which became their base of operations.

At the end of the 1980s, the ethnic minorities of northeast Burma became politically separated from the Communist Party of Burma. On 17 April 1989, Bao Youxiang's armed forces announced their separation from the Communist Party of Burma, and formed the United Myanmar Ethnicities Party, which later became the United Wa State Party. On 18 May, the United Wa State Army signed a ceasefire agreement with the State Law and Order Restoration Council, which replaced Ne Win's military regime following the 8888 Uprising. After the ceasefire, the Myanmar government began to call the region "Shan State Special Region No. 2 (Wa Region)" (Parauk: Hak Tiex Baux Nong (2) Meung Man; Chinese: 缅甸掸邦第二特区; Burmese: "ဝ" အထူးဒေသ(၂)).

In 1990s, Wa State obtained the Southern area by force. From 1999 to 2002, 80,000 former opium farmers from the northern area of Wa State were forcefully resettled into the more fertile south for food production, improving food security and laying the groundwork for a ban on drug production in Wa State. Some groups report that thousands died as a result of resettlement.

Tensions between the central government and Wa State were heightened in 2009. During this time, peace initiative proposals by Wa State were rejected by the Myanmar government. The government warned on 27 April 2010 that the WHP program could push Myanmar and Wa State into further conflict.

In 2012, Wa State began a major road construction program to link all townships with asphalt roads. By 2014, asphalt roads ran through the northern townships of Wa State and connected the Wa townships of Kunma, Nam Tit, and Mengmao to the Chinese towns of Cangyuan and Ximeng.

After the 2021 Myanmar coup d'état the Wa began to oppose the Myanmar government more directly, shifting away from their strategy of "forward defense" of supporting smaller anti-government forces militarily which was supposed to keep the Tatmadaw from violating ceasefires, with the goal of extending their political and military influence towards Central Myanmar.

When fighting in northern Shan State escalated in late October and early November in 2023, Wa State took a neutral position urging on 1 November for a ceasefire. The UWSP has again stated that they would retaliate against any military action against Wa.

Tensions between Wa State and Thailand increased in November 2024 over the presence of UWSA bases allegedly encroaching on Thai territory.

== Politics, society and law ==
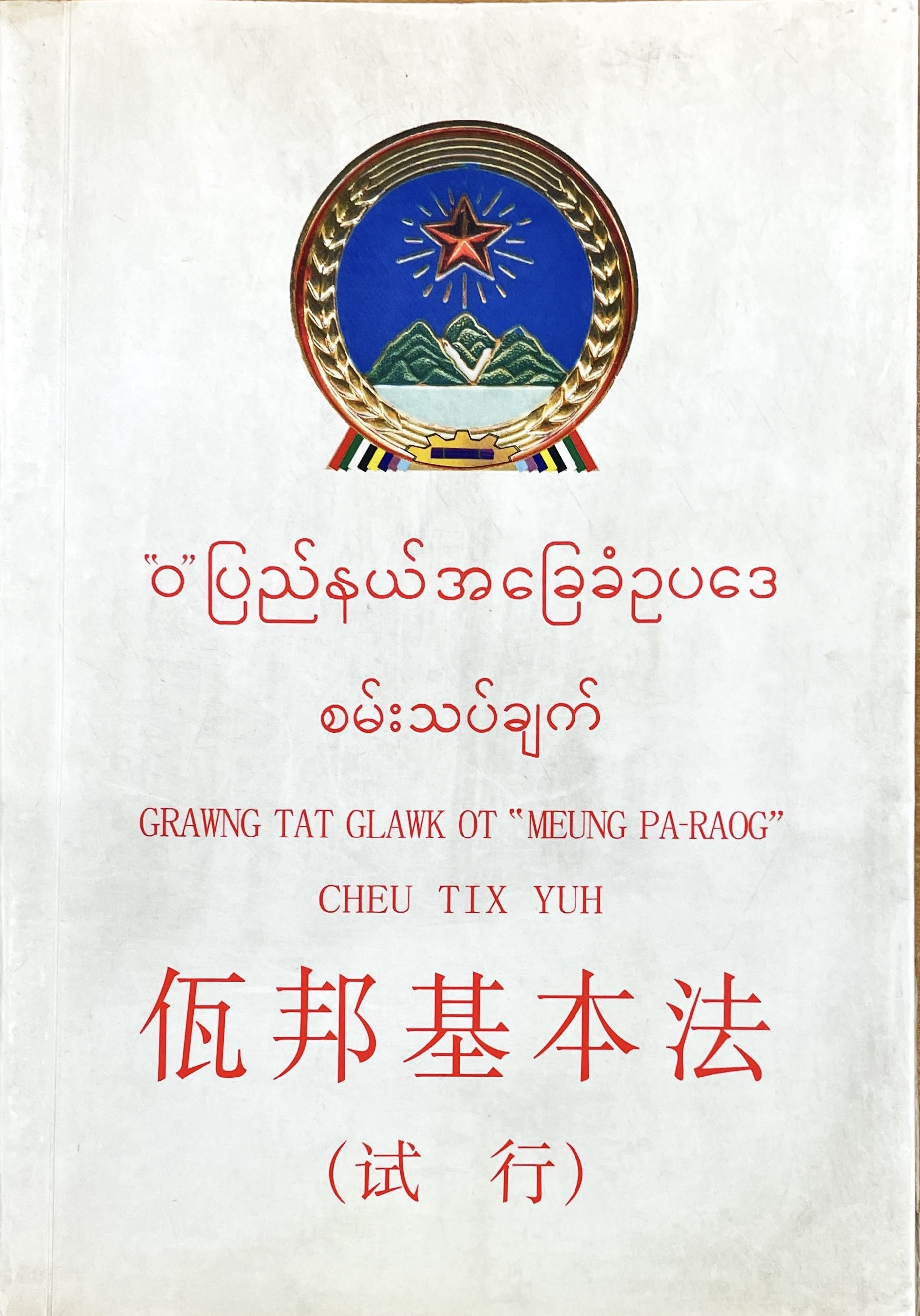
Wa State Basic Law

Wa State is divided into northern and southern regions which are separated from one another, with the 13,000 km^{2} (5,000 sq mi) southern region bordering Thailand and consisting of 200,000 people. The total area of the region controlled by Wa State is approximately 27,000 kilometers. The political leaders of Wa State are mostly ethnic Wa people.

The working language of the Wa State government is Mandarin Chinese. Southwest Mandarin and Wa are widely spoken by the population, with the language of education being Standard Chinese. Television broadcasts within Wa State are broadcast in both Mandarin and Wa. Commodities within Wa State are brought over from China, and the renminbi is commonly used for exchanges. China Mobile has cellular coverage over some parts of Wa State.

=== Government ===
The Wa State government emulates many political features of the government of the People's Republic of China, having a central party known as the United Wa State Party, which also has a Central Committee and a Politburo. Wa State also has a Wa People's Congress and a Wa People's Political Consultative Conference, respectively mimicking the National People's Congress and the Chinese People's Political Consultative Conference. Before the 2021 Myanmar coup d'état, whilst Wa State was highly autonomous from the control of the central government in Naypyidaw, their relationship was based on peaceful coexistence and Wa State recognised the sovereignty of the central government over all of Myanmar.

=== Legal system ===
The legal system in Wa State is based on the civil law system, with reference to the laws of China. As of at least 2015, Wa State imposes the death penalty (which is abolished at the national level in Myanmar) for armed assault, rape, murder, and child abuse. After being sentenced to death, prisoners are sent directly to the execution ground.

Labour camps exist in Wa State and relatives of those who are imprisoned or conscripted are often taken hostage by the state. The state is governed by a network of Maoist insurgents, traditional leaders such as headmen, businessmen, and traders, without democratic elections or the rule of law.

Most people do not have Chinese or Myanmar ID cards, but Wa State ID cards are often recognised in those countries. It is easy for citizens to enter them if they avoid the official border crossings.

=== Demographics ===
The most-practiced religion, outnumbering Islam, Buddhism and folk religions, is Christianity, even though there are frequent crackdowns on it conducted by the Maoist government. An example for this is a campaign against churches built after 1992 in September 2018.

There used to be up to 100,000 Chinese nationals residing in Wa State, many of them engaging in business. In 2021, the Chinese government ordered them to return to their homeland to combat online fraud allegedly committed by many of them. The Chinese exodus has had a negative impact on the Wa economy.

== Administrative divisions ==
Wa State is divided into districts (Parauk: kaung; Burmese: ခရိုင်; Chinese: 县), special townships (veng ting'; အထူးမြို့နယ်; 特区) and an administrative affairs committee. Each district is further divided into townships (veng'; မြို့နယ်; 区).

Below these are village tract-level administrations: village tracts (eung'; ကျေးရွာအုပ်စု; 乡) and streets (lah; 街).

| Level | District-level | Township-level | Village tract | Village |
|---|---|---|---|---|
| **Division**; **Type** | Special Township (veng ting' / 特区) | | Street (lah / 街); Village tract (eung' / 乡) | Group (plawg / 组); Village (yaong / 村) |
| **Division**; **Type** | District (kaung / 县) | Township (veng' / 区) | Street (lah / 街); Village tract (eung' / 乡) | Group (plawg / 组); Village (yaong / 村) |
| **Division**; **Type** | Administrative Affairs Committee; Cub Khrawm Kaing' Been' 行政管理委员会 | Township (veng' / 区) | Street (lah / 街); Village tract (eung' / 乡) | Group (plawg / 组); Village (yaong / 村) |

In the table above, names in apostrophes are in Wa/Mandarin order. Streets are metaphorical urban-type division name analogical to subdistricts of China and should not be understood literally. They are further subdivided into groups. Villages are rural counterparts of groups and are below townships.

In general, the Wa names of divisions follow the Romance naming order. For example, Veng Yaong Leen means Yaong Leen Township and is a veng (township) instead of a yaong (natural settlement).

In the sections below, names in bold indicate district seats. Names with "quotation marks" are pinyin transcriptions of Mandarin while names in italics are Burmese transcriptions of Mandarin. Although Mandarin is one of the four working languages of Wa State, some Mandarin administrative names are non-canonical. For example, 班阳区 and 邦洋区 are two different transcriptions of the same official Wa or Dai name of Pang Yang Township.

=== Northern area ===
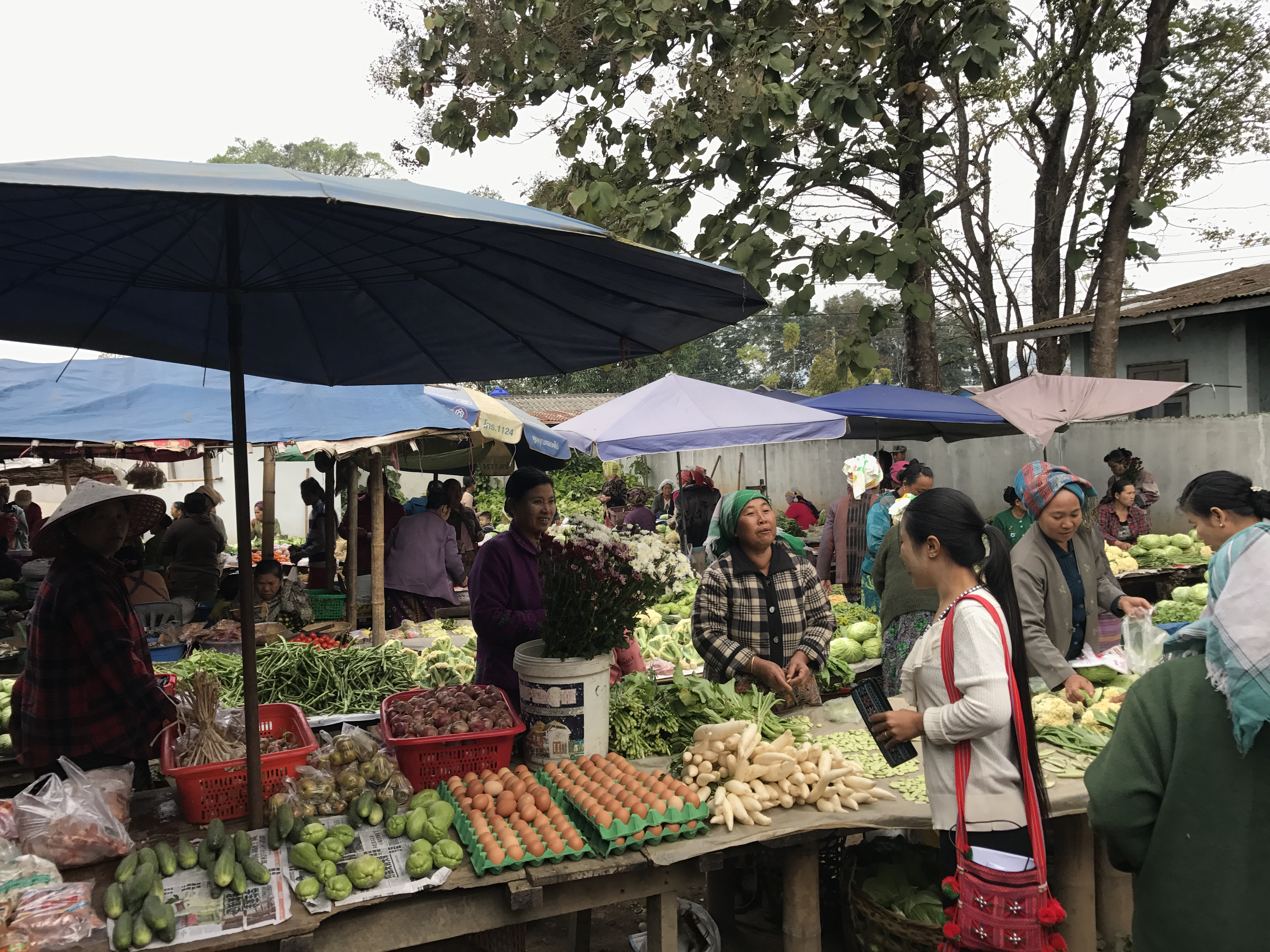
Market in Mong Khet Township

Wa State's northern area is divided into four counties and one special township. Each district is further divided into townships; there are 25 townships in total.

Districts

- Ho Pang District (kaung Ho Pang, 富邦县):
  1. Ho Pang Township (veng' Ho Pang, 富邦区, district seat)
  2. Pang Long Township (veng' Pang Long, 班弄区)
  3. Nang Teung Township (veng' Nang' Teung, 南邓区)
  4. Nawi Township (veng' Na' Vi', 纳威区)
- Mongmao District (kaung Meung' Mau, 勐冒县):
  5. Kaung Ming Sang Township (veng' Moeg Nu', 公明山区, district seat)
  6. Panwai Township (veng' Pang Vai, 邦外区)
  7. Taoh Mie Township (veng' Taoh' Mie', 栋玛区)
  8. Yaong Lin Township (veng' Yaong Leen', 王冷区)
  9. Long Tan Township (veng' Nhawng Ngik, 龙潭区)
  10. Ai Chun Township (veng' Cawng' Miang', 岩城区)
  11. Yingpan Township (veng' Kawn Mau, 营盘区)
  12. Man Ton Township (veng' Man Ton, 曼东区)
  13. Ling Haw Township (veng' Moeg Raix, 联合区)
  14. Klawngpa Township (veng' Klawng Pa, 格龙坝区)
- Monglin District (kaung Mang' Leen', 勐能县):
  15. Man Shiang Township (veng' Man Shiang, 曼相区)
  16. Nawng Khiet Township (veng' Nawng Khiet, 弄切区, district seat)
  17. Paleen Township (veng' Pa Leen', 南康伍区)
  18. Nakao Township (veng' Na' Kao', 纳高区)
  19. Pang Yang Township (veng' Pang Yang, 邦阳区)
- Mong Pawk District (kaung Meung' Bawg, 勐波县):
  20. Nam Phai Township (veng' Nam Phai, 南排区)
  21. Mong Pawk Township (veng' Meung' Pawg, 勐波区, district seat)
  22. Mong Ning Township (veng' Meung' Ngien, 勐宁区)
  23. Mong Ka Township (veng' Meung' Ka, 勐嘎区)
  24. Hotao Township (veng' Ho Tao, 贺岛区)
  25. Meng Phing Township (veng' Meung' Phien, 勐平区)

Special township

- Pangkham Special Township (veng ting' Pang Kham, 邦康特区):
  Guanghong Village tract (eung' Kwang' Hong', 广洪乡)
  Na Lawt Village tract (eung' Na Lawt, 那洛乡)
  Nan Phat Village tract (eung' Nam Phat, 南帕乡)
  Tawng Aw Village tract (eung' Tawng Aw, 等俄乡)
  Yaong Ting Village tract (eung' Yaong Ting, 永定乡)
  Man Mao Village tract (eung' Man Mao, 芒冒乡)

Wa State overlaps with eight de jure townships designated by the Burmese government. The geographic relationship between townships (second level) and special townships (first level) of Wa State and townships of Shan State are listed below:

Hopang Township of Shan State

- Ho Pang Township
- Nang Teung Township
- Nawi Township
- Pang Long Township

Mongmao Township of Shan State

- Kaung Ming Sang Township
- Man Ton Township
- Ling Haw Township

Pangwaun Township of Shan State

- Ai Chun Township (Cawng Miang)
- Long Tan Township
- Panwai Township
- Taoh Mie Township (Kunma)
- Wangleng Township (Yaong Leen)

Namphan Township of Shan State

- Yingpan Township (Kawn Mau)
- Paleen Township

Pangsang Township of Shan State

- Klawngpa Township
- Man Shiang Township
- Nakao Township
- Nawng Khiet Township
- Pangkham Special Township

Matman Township of Shan State

- Pang Yang Township

Mong Yang Township of Shan State

- Hotao Township
- Meng Phing Township
- Mong Ka Township
- Mong Pawk Township
- Nam Phai Township

Mong Khet Township of Shan State

- Mong Ngen Township (Mong Ning)

On 15 January 2024, Hopang and Pan Lon are officially transferred to Wa State by Myanmar's government.

=== Southern area ===
Wa State's southern area is administered by the Fourth Theater Command as the "171st military region" and enjoys a high degree of local autonomy. For example, the UWSP allowed it to implement its own COVID-19 policies. The region is not part of traditional Wa territory, but was granted in 1989 by the then-ruling Burmese military junta for the UWSA's cooperation in their efforts against drug warlord Khun Sa. These territories were originally inhabited by the Austroasiatic Tai Loi peoples, but now include significant Lahu and Shan communities, as well as Wa settlers.

The Southern area is administrated by the Southern Administrative Affairs Committee (Parauk: Cub Khrawm Kaing' Been' Plak Caw', Chinese: 南部地方行政管理委员会). The area can further divided into 6 townships:

- Wan Hoong Township (veng' Wan Hong, 万宏区, area seat)
- Hui Aw Township (veng' Hoe Aw, 回俄区)
- Yaong Khrao Township (veng' Yaong Khraox (Yaong Gawng), 凯隆区)
- Yaong Pang Township (veng' Yong Pang, 永邦区)
- Meung Cawd Township (veng' Meung Cawd, 勐角区)
- Yaong Moeg Township (veng' Yaong: Moeg (Num Moeg), 勐岗区)

==== Treatment of original inhabitants ====
In recent years tens of thousands of people (according to the Lahu National Development Organization claims 125,933 from 1999 to 2001 alone) have resettled from northern Wa State and central Shan State to the southern area, often due to pressure by the Wa government. These actions were intended to strengthen the Wa government's position there, especially the Mong Yawn valley which is surrounded by mountains on all sides is a strategically important location. Wa people were also relocated from villages on mountain peaks to the surrounding valleys, officially to offer the residents an alternative to the cultivation of opium. After the resettlement, the Wa government allowed ethnic Wa settlers to grow opium for three more years and sell it freely. Serious human rights violations were reported during the resettlement and many people have died, around 10,000 alone during the rains of 2000 since the Wa settlers were not accustomed to tropical diseases like malaria in the warmer southern area.

The original inhabitants of the area have been discriminated against by the settlers; their belongings were seized by them without compensation. Many abuses occur, including enslaving of the ones who complain about the Wa government. They have to work in the fields with chained-up legs. When a minority person cannot give enough money to the rulers, they can sell children seven years or older as soldiers to the United Wa State Army. Due to these harsh living conditions, many had no other choice but to leave their hometowns.

== Geography and economy ==
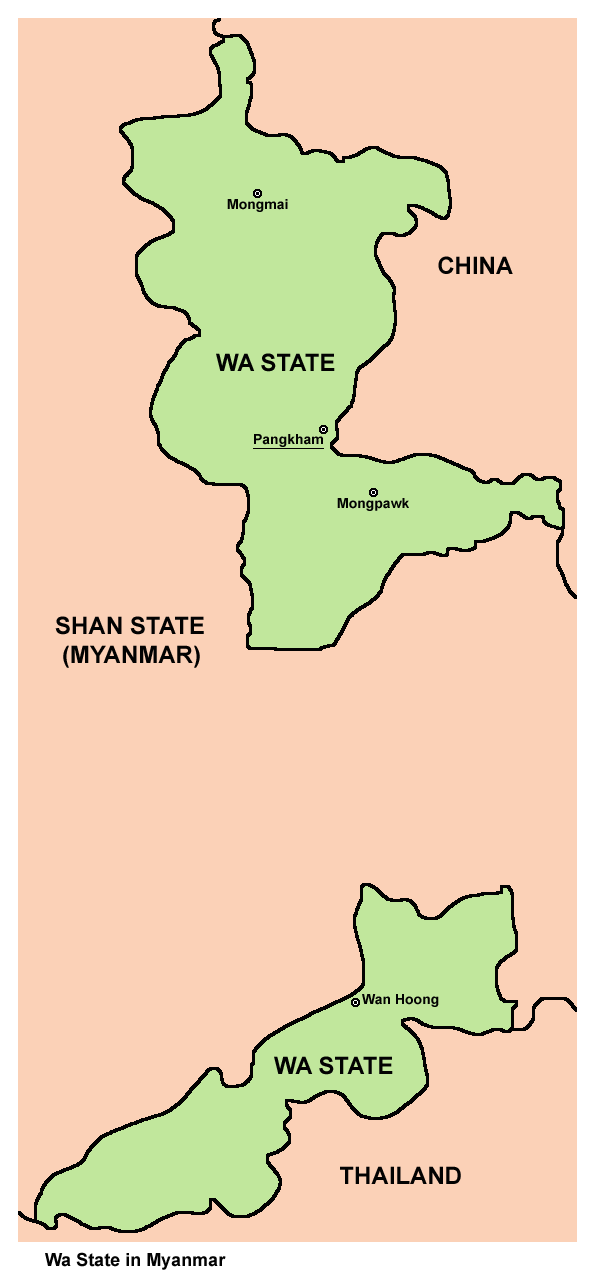
Map of Wa State

Areas controlled by Wa State amid the Myanmar civil war (2021–present)

The region is mainly mountainous, with deep valleys. The lowest points are approximately 600 metres (2,000 ft) above sea level, with the highest mountains over 3,000 metres (9,800 ft). Initially Wa State was heavily reliant on opium production. With Chinese assistance, there has been a move towards growing rubber and tea plantations. Wa State cultivates 220,000 acres of rubber. Due to the resettlement of residents from mountainous areas to fertile valleys, there is also cultivation of wet rice, corn and vegetables. Dozens died during the resettlement due to disease and road accidents. One of the main income sources of Wa State is the mining of resources like tin, zinc, lead and smaller amounts of gold. The proven tin ore reserves of Wa State amount to more than 50 million tons, currently 95% of the tin mine production of Myanmar comes from there, around one sixth of the world production.

Additionally, there is also a thriving industry around sectors like prostitution and gambling in the capital Pangkham that are related to tourism from China which was thriving before the COVID-19 pandemic. The region was able to vaccinate nearly all of its population against the virus by July 2021, one of the earliest dates in the world. In general, the state of development of Wa State is considerably higher than in the government-controlled areas of Myanmar, which is especially true for its capital. Wa State is economically dependent on China, which supports it financially and provides military and civilian advisors and weapons. It shares 82 miles (133 km) of frontier with China.

The Myanmar kyat is not legal tender anywhere in the Wa State. In the north, the Chinese yuan is legal tender, whilst the baht is legal tender in the south.

=== Illicit drug trade ===
The United Wa State Army (UWSA) is among the largest narcotics trafficking organizations in Southeast Asia.

The UWSA cultivated vast areas of land for the opium poppy, which was later refined to heroin. Methamphetamine trafficking was also important to the economy of Wa State. The money from the opium was primarily used for purchasing weapons which continues to be the case to some extent. At the same time, while opium poppy cultivation in Myanmar had declined year-on-year since 2015, cultivation area increased by 33% totalling 40,100 hectares alongside an 88% increase in yield potential to 790 metric tonnes in 2022 according to latest data from the United Nations Office on Drugs and Crime (UNODC) Myanmar Opium Survey 2022 With that said, the United Nations Office on Drugs and Crime (UNODC) has also warned that opium production in Myanmar may rise again if the economic crunch brought on by COVID-19 and the country's 1 February military coup persists, with significant public health and security consequences for much of Asia.

In August 1990, government officials began drafting a plan to end drug production and trafficking in Wa State. According to an interview with Wa officials in 1994, Bao Youyi (Tax Kuad Rang; also known as Bao Youyu) became wanted by the Chinese police for his involvement in drug trafficking. As a result, Bao Youxiang and Zhao Nyi-Lai went to Cangyuan Va Autonomous County of China and signed the Cangyuan Agreement with local officials, which stated that, "No drugs will go into the international society (from Wa State); no drugs will go into China (from Wa State); no drugs will go into Burmese government-controlled areas (from Wa State)." However, the agreement did not mention whether or not Wa State could sell drugs to insurgent groups.

In 1997, the United Wa State Party officially proclaimed that Wa State would be drug-free by the end of 2005. In 2005, Wa State authorities banned opium, and thereafter launched yearly drug crackdown campaigns. With the help of the United Nations (which began opium-substitution programs in 1998) and the Chinese government, many opium farmers in Wa State shifted to the production of rubber and tea. However, some poppy farmers continued to cultivate the flower outside of Wa State. Anti-drug strategies involved opium substitution programs for farmers, seeking alternative revenue sources in the area, roadbuilding to improve access to the hills, strict enforcement, and a population resettlement program. Between 1999 and 2006, the United Wa State Army began both voluntary resettlement and forced resettlement of between 50,000 and 100,000 villagers from the northern Wa State territory to the non-contiguous southern Wa State territory. Malaria and travel-related deaths were significant among the relocated population.

Although opium cultivation in Myanmar declined from 1997 to 2006 on the whole, the opium ban in Wa State eventually led to increased production elsewhere in Myanmar as opium producers sought to benefit from rising opium prices following the ban. From 2006 to 2012, overall opium cultivation in Myanmar doubled as production shifted to non-Wa State areas.

This population resettlement strategy relieved population pressures in the north Wa State hills and increased opportunities for the cultivation of rubber as an alternative cash crop to opium. However, international commodity prices for rubber decreased radically by December 2012, fell to a low in November 2015, and remained low from 2015 to 2018. Low rubber prices severely hampered Wa State's legitimate revenue and the income of rural people.

A BBC presentation aired on 19 November 2016 showed the burning of methamphetamine, as well as a thriving trade in illegal animal parts.

The production of crystal meth of high quality as well as heroin is still thriving and worth billions of dollars as of 2021. Cheaper ya ba tablets are made by neighboring rebel groups which depend on the Wa for raw materials – namely precursor chemicals sourced from the chemical industry in China and chemical industry in India which enter Myanmar directly or by transit through the Golden Triangle (Southeast Asia) and specifically Lao PDR via Viet Nam and Thailand. The regional synthetic drug production and trafficking industry, in which Wa State plays an important role, has become a major source of illegal drugs now exported across the region and beyond.

== See also ==
- Chinland, another self-governing polity in Myanmar
- Mang Lon
- Wa Women's Association
