= Namphan =

Namphan Na-hpan
- Town
- Location in Myanmar
- Coordinates: 22°36′0″N 99°5′0″E
- Country: Myanmar
- State: Shan State
- Self-administered Division: Wa
- District: Matman District
- Township: Namphan Township
- Elevation: 3,127 ft (953 m)

Population
  - Ethnicities: Wa
- Time zone: UTC+6.30 (MMT)

Namphan, also known as Na-hpan, is the capital town of Namphan Township, Shan State. It is a part of the Wa Self-Administered Division.

== Geography ==
Namphan is located in a small valley east of the Salween River, about 28 km from the border with China.
