= Kunmin =

- Village
- Location in Burma
- Coordinates: 23°26′N 98°42′E
- Country: Burma
- Division: Wa Self-Administered Division (Shan State)
- District: Hopang District
- Elevation: 450 m (1,480 ft)
- Time zone: UTC+6.30 (MST)

Kunmin is a village in Hopang District, Wa Self-Administered Division of Myanmar.

== Geography ==
Kunmin is located in the valley of the Nam Ting River, a tributary of the Salween, about 4 km west of Hopang.

== See also ==
- Wa States
