= Panlong Subtownship =

Panlong Pan Lon, Panglong, Pang Long
- Subtownship
- Location within Myanmar
- Coordinates: 23°15′23″N 98°47′8″E
- Country: Myanmar
- State: Shan State
- Self-Administered Division: Wa
- District: Hopang District
- Township: Hopang Township
- Capital: Pan Lon
- Elevation: 4,738 ft (1,444 m)
- Time zone: UTC+6:30 (MMT)

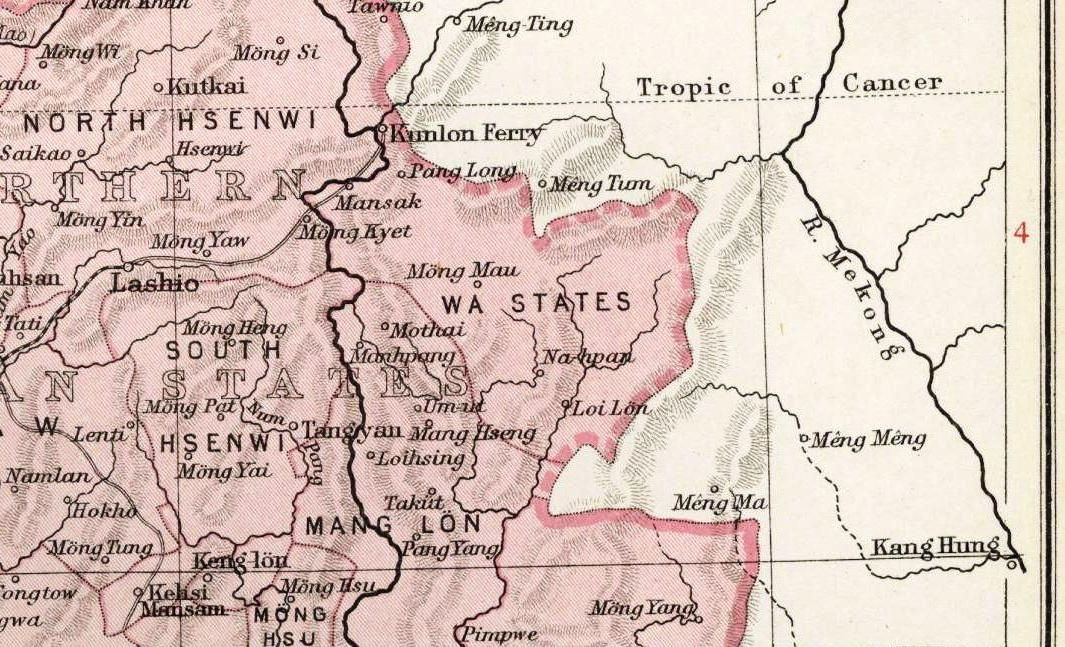
Pang Long (Panlong) in an early 20th century Imperial Gazetteer of India map section showing the Wa States. Note the border with China marked with a discontinuous darker pink line —unlike Kengtung State to the south and North Hsenwi to the north.

Panlong Subtownship is a subtownship of the Wa Self-Administered Division of Shan State, formerly and conterminously part of Hopang District.

Its main town and capital is Pan Lon, also known as Panlong and Pang Long, which was settled in the 19th century by Panthay people, mainly followers of Du Wenxiu, who had found refuge in the Wa States after having suffered persecution in China. The refugees were allowed to reside in the town by paying a tribute to the local Wa saopha.

== History ==
In the latter half of the nineteenth century the adherents to the Panthay cause, chiefly Hui migrants from Dali, Baoshan, Shanning, Menghua and elsewhere in southern and western Yunnan, were persecuted by the imperial Manchus in China. Wholesale massacres of Panthays followed. Many fled with their families across the Burmese border and took refuge in the Wa States where, about 1875, they set up the exclusively Panthay town of Panlong, becoming the de facto rulers of the area as their wealth and power increased.

According to Sir George Scott, at least 15 years after the collapse of the Yunnan Muslim Rebellion, the original Panthay settlements had grown to include numbers of Shan and other hill peoples. Scott considered the Panthays the wealthiest and most powerful community in the border region of the Shan States. He further mentioned that there was scarcity of water in Panglong while describing the town:

It stands at a height of four thousand six hundred feet above sea level, in a hollow surrounded by abrupt low hills, or rather cliffs, with a singularly jagged outline. The number of houses has been steadily increasing, but they have not been counted and estimates vary greatly. These are, however, certainly over three hundred. They are built of a kind of trellis or wattle, covered with mud and sometimes white-washed, and have thatch roofs. Each house stands with its own little fenced enclosure with a garden of peach and pear trees. There is a sort of horsepond in the village, but the water is undrinkable and the supply of good water is unsatisfactory. It is brought down in little runnels from the western hills. Many of the slopes round the village are jungle covered, but in some places they are cleared for poppy cultivation. All the roads to Pang Long pass through two small defiles, one north and the other south of the village. At both north and south entrances there are recently built gateways constructed of sun-dried bricks, with loop holes and a thatched roof.

In addition to the main settlement of Panglong, two other smaller Panthay villages 'which had about eighty houses', Panyao and Pachang, were established about 12 miles distant to the south and east respectively. The dominant group in the villages were the Panthay. George Scott comments that these Chinese Muslims were 'all merchants, mule-owners and men of substance'. Considering this wealth Scott concluded that it was only the military prowess and superior armaments of the Panthay which kept their annual tribute to the Wa saopha of Son Mu, one of the northern trans-Salween Wa States, fixed at the low figure of 100 rupees per annum.

By the time Scott visited Panglong – at least 15 years after the collapse of the Yunnan Muslim Rebellion – the original Panthay settlements had grown to include numbers of Shan and other hill peoples. The Panthay were, generally speaking, affluent enough to employ these more recent settlers as mule-drivers and 'to do the drudgery generally'. In large measure this affluence must have been due to the lifting of the Qing proscription on Hui settlement in Yunnan (c. 1888–1890), as a result of which the Panglong "Panthays" were able to re-establish trading contacts with their fellows remaining settled within Yunnan. As a result of this development, a number of the original refugees returned to China, merely maintaining agents at Panglong; certainly Scott noted that as many of the Panthay caravan traded into China as throughout the Shan States from Panglong.

=== 20th century ===
Initially the relations between the Wa ruler and the Muslim settlers had been cordial, with the Panthay headman paying a largely symbolical tribute to the Wa, and over the first thirty or so years the Panthays of Panlong continued to prosper while keeping the Wa people at a distance. However, by the early 1920s a feud had begun to develop between the Panthays and the Wa of neighbouring Phankham (Pankawn) who initially had welcomed them into their territory.

According to British colonial historian G.E. Harvey, by 1926 this uneasy situation erupted into the local "Wa Panthay War", in which the latter were victorious and as a result of which Panlong threw off its vassalage to Phankham and reinforced its dominance over the trade routes of the region. In addition to legitimate trading, by this time the Panthays of Panlong were securely established as 'the aristocrats of the opium business' in the region now commonly designated the Golden Triangle, leaving the Petty and risky business of peddling this highly profitable commodity locally to Shan and Han Chinese dealers, and instead running large, well-armed caravans in long-distance convoys far into Siam, Laos, Tonkin and Yunnan. When Harvey visited Panlong in 1931 he found that Panthay numbers had risen to 5,000 ('including local recruits'), that they were financed by Singaporean Chinese, had 130 mauser rifles with 1,500 mules, and exported opium by the hundredweight into French, Siamese and British territory, each muleload escorted by two riflemen.

Meanwhile, despite the relative importance of Panlong and the profits to be made from the long-distance caravans, other Panthays moved further into Burma, initially as miners anxious to exploit the ruby mines of Mogok, the Baldwin silver mines of Namtu in Northern Shan State, as well as the jade mines of Mogaung in Kachin State. Numbers of Panthay restaurateurs and innkeepers, merchants and traders settled in the urban centres of upland Burma – chiefly at Lashio, Kengtung, Bhamo and Taunggyi – to service the needs of these miners, passing caravaneers and the local inhabitants, whilst other settlements largely devoted to trade with the indigenous Shan and Karen populations sprang up along the Salween River. Finally, other Panthay elements moved to the major urban centres of the Burmese lowlands, most notably to Mandalay and Rangoon, where they flourished as merchants and representatives of their upcountry fellows, as well as middle-men between Panlong and the other "Overland Chinese" settlements of Upper Burma and the "Overseas Chinese" community of the lowland port-cities. Bassein and Moulmein must also have attracted some Panthay settlement, the latter port being a terminus of the overland caravan trade from Yunnan in its own right, via the northern Thai trade route through Kengtung, Chiang Mai and Mae Sariang.

During the greater part of the period of British rule in Burma these Panthay settlers flourished, specialising in all levels of commerce from the international gem markets to shop – and inn-keeping, mule-breeding and peddling or hawking – indeed Yunnanese peddlers (who may or may not have been Muslim) even penetrated into the unadministered and inaccessible hill tracts of "The Triangle" between Mali Hka and Nmai Hka, to the north of Myitkyina. Chiefly, however, beyond the urban centres of the Burmese lowlands, the Panthays continued their involvement in the caravan trade with Yunnan, transporting silk, tea, metal goods and foodstuffs, including eggs, fruit, nut and even the renowned Yunnanese hams (doubtless for consumption by their Han fellow countrymen) from China to Burma, and carrying back European manufactured goods, broadcloths, specialised foodstuffs (edible bird's nests, sea slugs) and above all raw cotton, to Yunnan.

In 1931 Harvey estimated the population of Panlong (which was predominantly Panthay) at 5,000 persons. Yet official estimates put the Panthay population of Burma at 2,202 for 1911 (1,427 males and 775 females), whilst by the 1921 Census of India this had declined to 1,517 (1,076 males and 441 females), and by 1931 to 1,106 (685 males and 421 females). Despite living in the hill areas of Wa State, these mountain Hui Muslims perceived themselves as Chinese people and traditionally have resisted identification with the Wa and other ethnic groups. They vehemently reject the label of 'hill tribe' that is generally used to refer to the inhabitants of the region.

The settlement of Panlong was raided and damaged by the Imperial Japanese Army troops who invaded Shan State along with the Northern Thai Army in 1942 and 1943.

Panglong, a Chinese Muslim town, was entirely destroyed by the Japanese forces. The Hui Ma Guanggui became the leader of the Hui Panglong self defense guard created by Su who was sent by the Kuomintang government of the Republic of China to fight against the Japanese invasion of Panglong in 1942. The Japanese destroyed Panglong, burning it and driving out the over 200 Hui households out as refugees. Yunnan and Kokang received Hui refugees from Panglong driven out by the Japanese. One of Ma Guanggui's nephews was Ma Yeye, a son of Ma Guanghua and he narrated the history of Panglang included the Japanese attack. An account of the Japanese attack on the Hui in Panglong was written and published in 1998 by a Hui from Panglong called "Panglong Booklet". The Japanese attack in Burma caused the Hui Mu family to seek refuge in Panglong but they were driven out again to Yunnan from Panglong when the Japanese attacked Panglong.
