= Taklu =

- Village
- Location in Burma
- Coordinates: 23°22′N 98°52′E
- Country: Burma
- Division: Wa Self-Administered Division (Shan State)
- District: Hopang District
- Elevation: 1,656 m (5,433 ft)
- Time zone: UTC+6.30 (MST)

Taklu is a village in Hopang District, Wa Self-Administered Division of Myanmar.

== Geography ==
Taklu is located in the mountainous area near the border with China, which lies east of the village. Mong Ling Shan mountain rises 4.5 km to the southeast.

== See also ==
- Wa States
