= Mongmao Township =

Mong Maw Meung Mau • ၸႄႈဝဵင်းမိူင်းမႂ်ႇ • 勐冒
- Township
- Mong Maw Township in Wa SAD
- Coordinates: 22°58′0″N 98°58′0″E
- Country (de jure): Myanmar
- Country (de facto): Wa State
- State: Shan State
- Self-Administered Division: Wa
- District: Hopang District
- Elevation: 4,820 ft (1,470 m)
- Time zone: UTC+6:30 (MMT)

Mong Maoe Township (Parauk: Meung Mau; Shan: ၸႄႈဝဵင်းမိူင်းမႂ်ႇ, romanized: tsāaewéng Moeng Hmaue, lit. 'township of New Territories', Chinese: 勐冒县) is officially Mong Maw Township (Burmese: မိုင်းမောမြို့နယ်)), locally known as Moeknu (Wa: Mōuig Nū), is a township of Hopang District of Shan State. Prior to 2011, it belonged to Lashio District. Its principal town is Mongmao.

== History ==
Its population before 1995 was 77,378 and Wa people were 59,105 out of them.

Ministers, Ambassadors and UN Resident representatives made a tour in January 2004 and they were told in a presentation that there was no poppy fields in Wa area including Mongmao. Rubber, orange, lychee and tea are grown as poppy substitute.

Mongmao Constituency for People Assembly was canceled in General Election 2010. Paung Nap from Wa Democratic Party is elected for National Assembly seat allocated for Hopang, Mongmao, Pangwaun, Namphan, Matman and Pangsang Township.
