= Mong Pawk =

Mong Pawk မိုင်းပေါက်မြို့ • ဝဵင်းမိူင်းပွၵ်ႉ • Meung' Pawg • 勐波
- Location in Myanmar
- Coordinates: 22°1′N 99°19′E
- Country: Myanmar
- Division: Shan State
- District: Kengtung District
- Township: Mong Yang Township

Population (2005)
  - Ethnicities: Shan Wa
  - Religions: Buddhism
- Time zone: UTC+6.30 (MST)

Mong Pawk (Burmese: မိုင်းပေါက်မြို့, Shan: ဝဵင်းမိူင်းပွၵ်ႉ, Parauk: Meung' Pawg, Chinese: 勐波) is a city in the de facto independent Wa State of far eastern Myanmar only 10 kilometres from the border with China. It is just south of Pangkham. It is the largest city of Wa State.

== Geography ==
Mong Pawk is part of Mong Yang Township, which is under Myanmar Government control, but the city itself is under the control of UWSA. The 23rd anniversary of a mutiny was held in Mong Pawk on 17 April 2012.

In 2008 the United Wa State Army (UWSA) was strongly against giving away the area of Mong Pawk from its control because it serves as a link with its ally, the National Democratic Alliance Army in Mongla.
