= Hopang Township =

Hopang ဟိုပန်မြို့နယ်
- Township
- Hopang Township in the Wa Self-administered Division
- Coordinates: 23°25′0″N 98°45′0″E
- Country: Myanmar
- State: Shan State
- Division: Wa Self-Administered Division
- District: Hopang District

Government
  - County Magistrate: Li Sai Rong (李赛茸) (United Wa State Party)

Area
  - Total: 556.64 sq mi (1,441.7 km^{2})
- Elevation: 1,532 ft (467 m)

Population (2023)
  - Total: 44,359
  - Density: 79.691/sq mi (30.769/km^{2})
- Time zone: UTC+6:30 (MMT)

Hopang Township (Burmese: ဟိုပန်မြို့နယ်) also called Ho Pang County (Chinese: 富邦县, Parauk: Kaung Ho Pang)) is a township of the Wa Self-Administered Division in the Shan State of Myanmar (Burma). The principal town is Hopang. It is one of the 6 townships of Wa Self-Administered Division. It became part of Hopang District instead of Kunlong District in 2011.

The township has 3 towns which have 23 urban wards as well as 309 villages grouped into 54 village tracts.

== History ==
Hopang and Pan Lon were originally under the de facto control of Myanmar's Wa Self-Administered Division.

In early January 2024, control was transferred to the Wa State. On 10 June, the Central Committee of the United Wa State Party issued the "Decision on Establishing Ho Pang County in the Wa State", resolving to establish Ho Pang County. It placed the two districts of Hopang and Panlong, newly taken over in early January, along with the Nang Teung Special District and the Nawi District of Mengmau County, under the jurisdiction of Ho Pang County. Following the establishment of the Ho Pang County Government, the former Ho Pang Region Provisional Administrative Committee was immediately dissolved. From 11 June onwards, the Wa State News Agency's publication Wa State News began using the designation "Ho Pang County" in its reporting on Ho Pang-related matters.

The Wa State subdivdes Hopang Township into four districts: Ho Pang, Pan Lon, Nang Teung and Navi. These are not to be confused with Hopang District, which encompasses the entire township and more.

== Economy and Transport ==
There are 3,713 acres of rubber plantation in 2007.

The 3 main routes which link Hopang and other parts are 804 mile long Hopang-Lashio-Mandalay-Taunggyi-Mongpyin-Matman Road, the 343 mile long Hopang-Lashio-Tangyan-Panghsan-Matman Road and the 257 mile long Hopang-Mongmao-Panghsan-Matman Road.

== Demographics ==
Its total population before 1995 was 70,720 and Wa nationals were 24,024.
