= Mongmao =

Mongmao ဝဵင်းမိူင်းမႂ်ႇ, weng Meung Mau
- Town
- Mong Maw
- Location within Myanmar
- Coordinates: 22°58′0″N 98°58′0″E
- Country: Myanmar
- State: Shan
- Self-administered Division: Wa
- District: Hopang District
- Township: Mongmao Township
- Elevation: 4,820 ft (1,470 m)
- Time zone: UTC+6:30 (MMT)

Mong Maoe (Parauk: weng Meung Mau; Shan (Dai Yai): ဝဵင်းမိူင်းမႂ်ႇ weng Moeng Hmaue (town of new territory); Chinese: 勐冒; pinyin: Měng mào; မိုင်းမော မြို့) is the capital town of Mongmao Township of Shan State. It is under de facto administration of Wa State as the Gongmingshan District (Mandarin: 公明山区; Chinese Wa: Gawng Moeknu/Mgōng Mouig Nū) or Loi Mu District (Wa: Lōi Mū) of Meng Hmae County, named after the Mount Gongming.

Rubber finishing factories were constructed in Mongmao and in Pangsang and Namtit as well.
