= Pan Lon =

- Town
- Location in Myanmar (Burma)
- Coordinates: 23°15′N 98°47′E
- Country: Myanmar
- State: Shan State
- Self-Administered Division: Wa
- District: Hopang District
- Township: Hopang Township
- Subtownship: Panlong Subtownship
- Elevation: 1,490 m (4,890 ft)
- Time zone: UTC+6.30 (MMT)

Pan Lon (Note: Also known as Panglong, Panlong and Pan Nawng.) (Parauk: Pang Long, Chinese: 班弄; pinyin: Bānnòng; also 邦隆; Bānglóng, Burmese: ပန်လုံမြို့) is the capital of Panlong Subtownship, Hopang District, in the Wa Self-Administered Division of Myanmar.

== Geography ==
The town is located west of the Salween on a high mountain valley between two ridges. The area is near the border with China, which lies at Mong Ling Shan mountain, about 11 km to the NE.

== History ==
Sir George Scott described the town thus:

... It stands at a height of four thousand six hundred feet above sea level, in a hollow surrounded by abrupt low hills, or rather cliffs, with a singularly jagged outline. The number of houses has been steadily increasing, but they have not been counted and estimates vary greatly. These are, however, certainly over three hundred. They are built of a kind of trellis or wattle, covered with mud and sometimes white-washed, and have thatch roofs. Each house stands with its own little fenced enclosure with a garden of peach and pear trees. There is a sort of horsepond in the village, but the water is undrinkable and the supply of good water is unsatisfactory. It is brought down in little runnels from the western hills. Many of the slopes round the village are jungle covered, but in some places they are cleared for poppy cultivation. All the roads to Pang Long pass through two small defiles, one north and the other south of the village. At both north and south entrances there are recently built gateways constructed of sun-dried bricks, with loop holes and a thatched roof.

Panglong, a Chinese Muslim town in British Burma, was entirely destroyed by the Japanese invaders in the Japanese invasion of Burma. The Hui Muslim Ma Guanggui became the leader of the Hui Panglong self defense guard created by Su who was sent by the Kuomintang government of the Republic of China to fight against the Japanese invasion of Panglong in 1942. The Japanese destroyed Panglong, burning it and driving out the over 200 Hui households out as refugees. Yunnan and Kokang received Hui refugees from Panglong driven out by the Japanese. One of Ma Guanggui's nephews was Ma Yeye, a son of Ma Guanghua and he narrated the history of Panglang included the Japanese attack. An account of the Japanese attack on the Hui in Panglong was written and published in 1998 by a Hui from Panglong called "Panglong Booklet". The Japanese attack in Burma caused the Hui Mu family to seek refuge in Panglong but they were driven out again to Yunnan from Panglong when the Japanese attacked Panglong.
