= Mong Yang District =

Mong Yang Township Mong Yang District ၸႄႈဝဵင်းမိူင်းယၢင်း, မိုင်းယန်းမြို့နယ် ၸႄႈတွၼ်ႈမိူင်းယၢင်း, မိုင်းယန်းခရိုင်
- Township and District
- Location in Shan State
- Coordinates: 21°50′40″N 99°40′45″E
- Country: Myanmar
- State: Shan State
- District: Mong Yang District
- Capital: Mong Yang
- Elevation: 944 m (3,097 ft)
- Time zone: UTC+6.30 (MMT)

Mong Yang Township (Shan: ၸႄႈဝဵင်းမိူင်းယၢင်း, Burmese: မိုင်းယန်းမြို့နယ်) is the only township of Mong Yang District (Shan: ၸႄႈတွၼ်ႈမိူင်းယၢင်း, Burmese: မိုင်းယန်းခရိုင်) (officially Mong Yan) in eastern Shan State, Myanmar. The capital town is Mong Yang.

In 2022, Mong Yang Township was promoted to its own district, splitting off from former Kengtung District. Its part under Eastern Shan State Special Region 4 administration is known as Sele District.

The township also contains the Mong Pawk Subtownship. Mong Pawk is part of it but is under United Wa State Army control as part of the de facto Wa State.
