= Wa Women's Association =

Human rights organisation in Myanmar

- Type: NGO
- Region served: Wa State
- Fields: Philanthropy; Cultural heritage

Wa Women's Association is a human rights organisation based in Wa State, Myanmar. The organisation supports women's rights and promote charitable and Wa cultural programmes, for example through dance and promotion of the Wa script.

In the 1990s the organisation established an orphanage in Pangkham for children whose parents were killed in fighting between United Wa State Army and Shan forces. In 2016 they created a Wa State Charity Association to coordinate philanthropic work. Their work is comparable to other women's organisations in Myanmar, such as the Karen Women’s Organization (KWO), the Ta-ang Women’s Organisation (TWO), and the Kachin Women’s Association of Thailand (KWAT).

Many of the women who lead and volunteer with the WWA are the wives of military commanders in the regions. In 2021 Li Yuheng, the deputy director of the Wa Women's Association, died.
