= Namtit Subtownship =

Namtit Nang Teung • ဝဵင်းၼမ်ႉတိုၵ်း • 南邓
- Subtownship
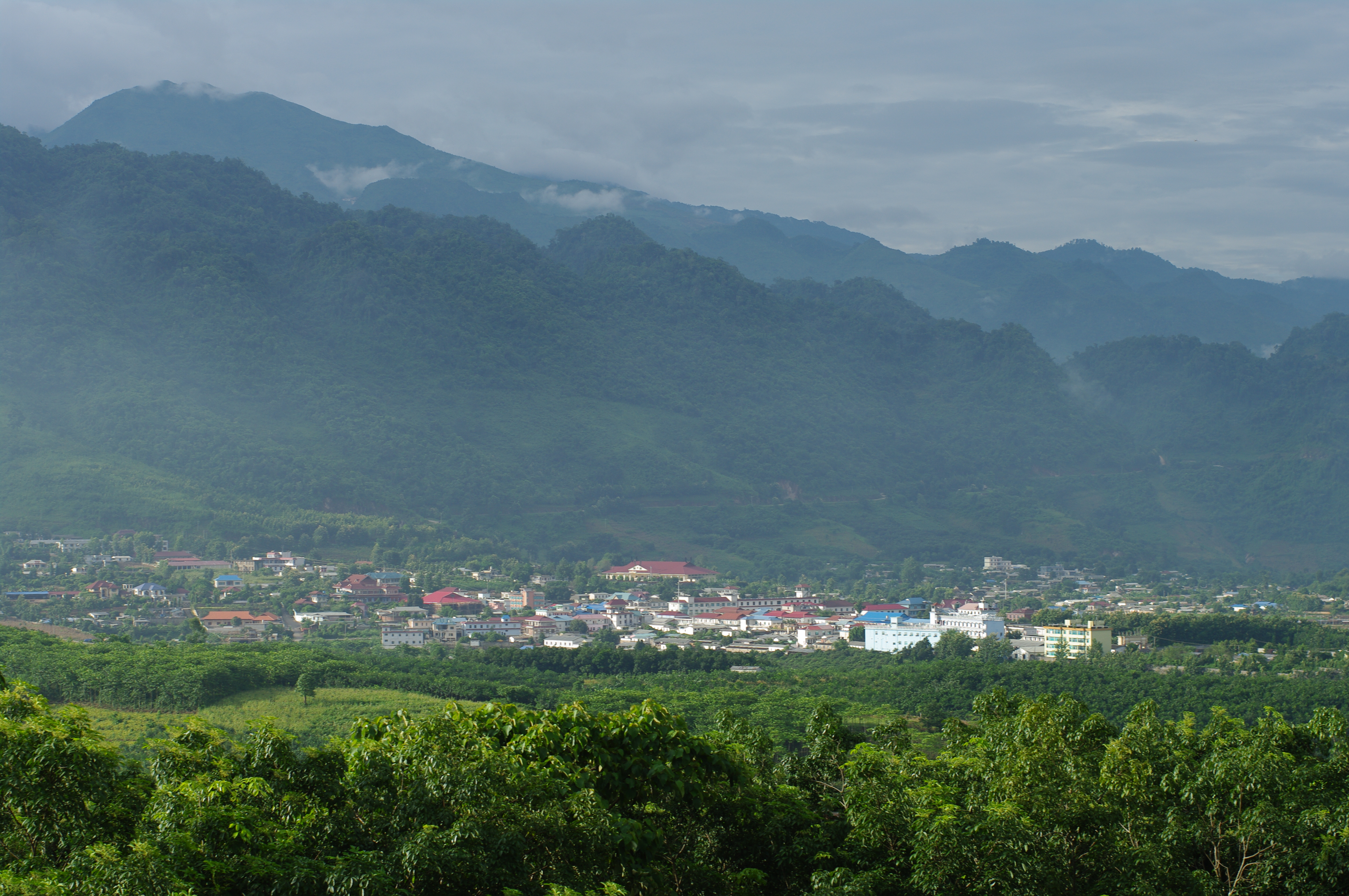
- View of Namtit from Mengding Qingshuihe, China

- Location within Myanmar
- Coordinates: 23°28′0″N 98°51′0″E
- Country: Myanmar (de jure); Wa State (Controlled by)
- State: Shan State
- Self-Administered Division: Wa
- District: Hopang District
- Township: Hopang Township
- Elevation: 1,795 ft (547 m)
- Time zone: UTC+6:30 (MMT)

Namtit Subtownship (Parauk: Nang Teung; simplified Chinese: 南邓; traditional Chinese: 南鄧; pinyin: Nán dèng) is a subtownship of the Wa Self-Administered Division of Shan State, Myanmar (formerly Burma) formerly and conterminously part of Hopang District. Its principal town is Namtit. It is de facto administrated as the Nang Teung Special District (simplified Chinese: 南邓特区; traditional Chinese: 南鄧特區; pinyin: Nán dèng tèqū; Wade–Giles: Nan-teng Tʻe-chʻü) of Wa State.

Rubber finishing factories were constructed in Mongmao and in Pangsang and in Namtit as well.
