= Hopang =

- Town
- Location in Myanmar (Burma)
- Coordinates: 23.4248°N 98.7523°E
- Country: Myanmar
- State: Shan State
- Self-Administered Division: Wa Self-Administered Division
- District: Hopang District
- Township: Hopang Township

Population
  - Ethnicities: Wa
- Time zone: UTC+6.30 (MMT)

Hopang (Parauk: Ho Pang, Chinese: 户板; pinyin: Hùbǎn, Burmese: ဟိုပန်မြို့) is the capital of Hopang Township, Shan State, Myanmar (Burma). It is also the government designated capital of the Wa Self-Administered Division.

== Geography ==
Hopang is located in the valley of the Nam Ting River, a tributary of the Salween.
