= Namphan Township =

Namphan Township နားဖန်းမြို့နယ်
- Township
- Narphan Township
- Namphan Township in the Wa SAD
- Coordinates: 22°36′0″N 99°5′0″E
- Country: Myanmar
- State: Shan State
- Self-Administered Division: Wa
- District: Matman District
- Time zone: UTC+6:30 (MMT)

Namphan Township, also known as Nar-hpan, is a township of the Wa Self-Administered Division of Shan State, formerly and conterminously part of Matman District. Prior to 2011, it was part of Hopang District and Lashio District. Its capital is Namphan.

== Demographics ==
The total population before 1995 was 48,466 and 37,024 of them were Wa people.
