= Pangwaun Township =

Pangwaun
- Township
- Pangwaun Township in Wa SAD
- Coordinates: 23°2′0″N 99°19′0″E
- Country: Myanmar
- State: Shan State
- Self-Administered Division: Wa
- District: Hopang District
- Elevation: 3,419 ft (1,042 m)
- Time zone: UTC+6:30 (MMT)

Pangwaun Township, also known as Panwai and Panwine, is a township of the Wa Self-Administered Division of Shan State, formerly and conterminously part of Hopang District. Prior to 2011, it belonged to Lashio District. Its main town is Pangwaun.

The total population before 1995 was 33,418 and Wa people were 25,526 out of total.

Pangwaun Constituency for People Assembly and Shan State Assembly was excluded in General Election of 2010.
