= Pangsang Township =

Pangsang
- Township
- Pangsang in the Wa Self-administered Division
- Coordinates: 22°10′0″N 98°10′0″E
- Country: Myanmar
- State: Shan State
- Division: Wa Self-Administered Division
- District: Matman District
- Elevation: 1,709 ft (521 m)
- Time zone: UTC+6:30 (MMT)

Pangsang Township is a township in the Matman District, Wa Self-Administered Division of Shan State, formerly and conterminously part of Matman District. Prior to 2011, it was part of Hopang District and Lashio District. Its capital town is Pangsang (also known as Pangkham).

== Demographics ==
The population of Pangsang Township before 1995 was 51,895 and Wa people were only 24,145 among them.
