= Townships of Myanmar =

Third-level administrative divisions of Myanmar

Townships of Myanmar

Townships (Burmese: မြို့နယ်, Mrui.nay; IPA: [mjo̰nɛ̀]) are the third-level administrative divisions of Myanmar. They are the sub-divisions of the districts of Myanmar. According to the Myanmar Information Management Unit (MIMU), as of December 2015, there are 330 townships in Myanmar.

Townships are the basic administrative unit of local governance and are the only type of administrative division that cover all of Myanmar. A township is administered by a township administrator, a civil servant appointed through the General Administration Department (GAD) of the Ministry of Home Affairs (MOHA). The minister of home affairs is to be appointed by the military according to the 2008 constitution. Townships are supervised by districts.

== Central Myanmar ==
=== Magway Region ===
Name	List
Aunglan District	1. Aunglan Township; 2. Sinbaungwe Township
Chauk District	1. Chauk Township; 2. Yenangyaung Township
Gangaw District	1. Gangaw Township; 2. Saw Township; 3. Tilin Township; 1. Kyaukhtu Subtownship
Magway District	1. Magway Township; 2. Myothit Township; 3. Natmauk Township; 4. Taungdwingyi Township
Minbu District	1. Minbu Township; 2. Ngape Township; 3. Pwintbyu Township; 4. Salin Township; 5. Sidoktaya Township
Pakokku District	1. Myaing Township; 2. Pakokku Township; 3. Pauk Township; 4. Seikphyu Township; 5. Yesagyo Township
Thayet District	1. Kamma Township; 2. Mindon Township; 3. Minhla Township; 4. Thayet Township

=== Mandalay Region ===
Name	List
Amarapura District	1. Amarapura Township
Aungmyethazan District	1. Aungmyethazan Township; 2. Patheingyi Township; 3. Madaya Township
Kyaukse District	1. Kyaukse Township; 2. Myittha Township; 3. Sintgaing Township
Maha Aungmye District	1. Chanayethazan Township; 2. Chanmyathazi Township; 3. Maha Aungmye Township; 4. Pyigyidagun Township
Meiktila District	1. Mahlaing Township; 2. Meiktila Township; 3. Thazi Township; 4. Wundwin Township
Myingyan District	1. Myingyan Township; 2. Natogyi Township; 3. Taungtha Township
Tada-U District	1. Nganzun Township; 2. Tada-U Township
Nyaung-U District	1. Nyaung-U Township; 2. Kyaukpadaung Township^{*}; 1. Ngathayauk Subtownship
Pyinoolwin District	1. Pyinoolwin Township
Thabeikkyin District	1. Mogok Township; 2. Singu Township; 3. Thabeikkyin Township; 1. Tagaung Subtownship
Yamethin District	1. Pyawbwe Township; 2. Yamethin Township

Notes:

^{*} Formerly a part of Myingyan District.

=== Naypyidaw Union Territory ===
Name	List
Dekkhina District (South Naypyidaw)	1. Dekkhinathiri Township; 2. Lewe Township
Pyinmana District	1. Pyinmana Township; 2. Zabuthiri Township
Ottara District (North Naypyidaw)	1. Ottarathiri Township; 2. Tatkon Township
Zeyathiri District (Central Naypyidaw)	1. Pobbathiri Township; 2. Zeyathiri Township

== East Myanmar ==
=== Kayah State ===
Name	List
Bawlakhe District	1. Bawlakhe Township; 2. Hpasawng Township; 1. Ywathit Subtownship
Demoso District	1. Demoso Township; 2. Hpruso Township
Loikaw District	1. Loikaw Township; 2. Shadaw Township
Mese District	1. Mese Township

=== Shan State ===
==== East Shan State ====
Name	List
Kengtung District	1. Kengtung Township; 2. Mong Khet Township; 3. Mong Ping Township; 1. Mine Tontar Subtownship
Mong La District	1. Mong La Township
Mong Hsat District	1. Mong Hsat Township; 1. Mong Khoke Subtownship
Mong Ton District	1. Mong Ton Township; 1. Ponparkyin Subtownship; 2. Mong Hta Subtownship
Mong Yang Township	1. Mong Yang Township; 1. Mine Pawk Subtownship
Mong Yawng District	1. Mong Yawng Township; 1. Mineyu Subtownship
Tachileik District	1. Mong Hpayak Township; 2. Tachileik Township; 1. Kenglap Subtownship (Kyainglap); 2. Talay Subtownship

==== North Shan State (excluding Wa) ====
Name	List
Kutkai District	1. Kutkai Township; 1. Tarmoenye Subtownship
Kyaukme District	1. Hsipaw Township; 2. Kyaukme Township; 3. Namtu Township; 4. Nawnghkio Township; 1. Mong Lon Subtownship; 2. Mong Ngaw Subtownship
Lashio District	1. Hsenwi Township; 2. Kunlong Township; 3. Lashio Township
Mu Se District	1. Mu Se Township; 2. Nanhkan Township; 1. Pang Hseng Subtownship; 2. Mong Ko Subtownship; 3. Man Hio Subtownship
Mongmit District	1. Mabein Township; 2. Mongmit Township
Tangyan District	1. Mongyai Township; 2. Tangyan Township
Kokang Self-Administered Zone	1. Laukkai Township; 2. Konkyan Township; 1. Chinshwehaw Subtownship; 2. Mawhtike Subtownship
Pa Laung Self-Administered Zone	1. Mantong Township; 2. Namhsan Township

==== Wa Self-Administered Division ====
(Part of North Shan State)

Name	List
Hopang District	1. Hopang Township; 2. Mongmao Township; 3. Pangwaun Township; 1. Namtit Subtownship; 2. Panlong Subtownship
Matman District	1. Matman Township; 2. Namphan Township; 3. Pangsang Township; 1. Man Kan Subtownship

==== South Shan State ====
Name	List
Kalaw District	1. Kalaw Township; 2. Nyaungshwe Township; 3. Pekon Township
Langkho District	1. Langkho Township; 2. Mawkmai Township; 3. Mong Pan Township; 1. Homein Subtownship
Loilen District	1. Lai-Hka Township; 2. Loilen Township; 3. Mong Kung Township; 1. Panglong Subtownship
Mong Hsu District	1. Mong Hsu Township (Mong Shu); 2. Kyethi Township; 1. Mong San Subtownship; 2. Mong Nawng Subtownship
Nansang District	1. Kunhing Township; 2. Mong Nai Township; 3. Nansang Township; 1. Karli Subtownship; 2. Keng Tawng Subtownship; 3. Kholam Subtownship
Taunggyi District	1. Lawksawk Township; 2. Taunggyi Township; 1. Indaw Subtownship; 2. Kyauktalongyi Subtownship
Danu Self-Administered Zone	1. Pindaya Township; 2. Ywangan Township
Pa-O Self-Administered Zone	1. Hopong Township; 2. Hsi Hseng Township; 3. Pinlaung Township; 1. Naungtayar Subtownship

Notes:
^{1} - part of Pa-O Self-Administered Zone
^{2} - part of Danu Self-Administered Zone

== Lower Myanmar ==
=== Ayeyarwady Region ===
Name	List
Hinthada District	1. Hinthada Township; 2. Lemyethna Township; 3. Zalun Township
Kyonpyaw District	1. Kyaunggon Township; 2. Kyonpyaw Township; 3. Yekyi Township; 1. Ngathaingchaung Subtownship
Labutta District	1. Labutta Township; 2. Mawlamyinegyun Township; 1. Pyinsalu Subtownship
Ma-ubin District	1. Danubyu Township; 2. Maubin Township; 3. Nyaungdon Township; 4. Pantanaw Township
Myanaung District	1. Ingapu Township; 2. Kyangin Township; 3. Myanaung Township
Myaungmya District	1. Einme Township; 2. Myaungmya Township; 3. Wakema Township
Pathein District	1. Kangyidaunt Township; 2. Ngapudaw Township; 3. Pathein Township; 4. Thabaung Township; 1. Hainggyikyun Subtownship; 2. Ngayokaung Subtownship; 3. Ngwesaung Subtownship; 4. Shwethaungyan Subtownship
Pyapon District	1. Bogale Township; 2. Dedaye Township; 3. Kyaiklat Township; 4. Pyapon Township; 1. Ahmar Subtownship

=== Bago Region ===
==== East Bago Region ====
Name	List
Bago District	1. Bago Township; 2. Kawa Township; 3. Thanatpin Township; 4. Waw Township
Nyaunglebin District	1. Daik-U Township; 2. Nyaunglebin Township; 3. Kyauktaga Township; 4. Kyaukkyi Township; 5. Shwegyin Township
Taungoo District	1. Oktwin Township; 2. Pyu Township; 3. Htantabin Township; 4. Taungoo Township; 5. Yedashe Township

==== West Bago Region ====
Name	List
Pyay District	1. Pandaung Township; 2. Paukkaung Township; 3. Pyay Township; 4. Shwedaung Township
Thayarwady District	1. Gyobingauk Township; 2. Letpadan Township; 3. Minhla Township; 4. Monyo Township; 5. Okpho Township; 6. Tharrawaddy Township
Nattalin District	1. Nattalin Township; 2. Zigon Township; 3. Thegon Township; 4. Paungde Township

=== Yangon Region ===
==== Townships of Yangon ====
Name	List
Ahlon District	1. Ahlon Township; 2. Kyimyindaing Township; 3. Sanchaung Township
Botataung District	1. Botataung Township; 2. Dawbon Township; 3. Mingala Taungnyunt Township; 4. Pazundaung Township; 5. Thaketa Township
Dagon Myothit District	1. Dagon Seikkan Township; 2. East Dagon Township; 3. North Dagon Township; 4. South Dagon Township
Insein District	1. Insein Township; 2. Hlaingthaya East Township; 3. Hlaingthaya West Township
Kamayut District	1. Bahan Township; 2. Kamayut Township
Kyauktada District	1. Dagon Township; 2. Kyauktada Township; 3. Lanmadaw Township; 4. Latha Township; 5. Pabedan Township
Mayangon District	1. Hlaing Township; 2. Mayangon Township; 3. North Okkalapa Township
Mingaladon District	1. Mingaladon Township; 2. Shwepyitha Township
Thingangyun District	1. South Okkalapa Township; 2. Tamwe Township; 3. Thingangyun Township; 4. Yankin Township
Twante District	1. Dala Township^{1}; 2. Seikkyi Kanaungto Township

Notes

^{1} - partially in Yangon city

==== Townships outside Yangon ====
Name	List
Taikkyi District	1. Taikkyi Township
Hlegu District	1. Hlegu Township
Hmawbi District	1. Hmawbi Township; 2. Htantabin Township
Thanlyin District	1. Cocokyun Township; 2. Kayan Township; 3. Kyauktan Township; 4. Thanlyin Township; 5. Thongwa Township; 1. Tada Subtownship
Twante District	1. Dala Township; 2. Kawhmu Township; 3. Kungyangon Township; 4. Twante Township

== North Myanmar ==
=== Kachin State ===
Name	List
Bhamo District	1. Bhamo Township; 2. Mansi Township; 3. Momauk Township; 4. Shwegu Township; 1. Dotphoneyan Subtownship; 2. Lwegel Subtownship; 3. Myohla Subtownship
Mohnyin District	1. Hpakant Township; 2. Mogaung Township; 3. Mohnyin Township; 1. Hopin Subtownship; 2. Kamine Subtownship
Myitkyina District	1. Chipwi Township; 2. Hsawlaw Township; 3. Injangyang Township; 4. Myitkyina Township; 5. Tanai Township; 6. Waingmaw Township; 1. Hsadone Subtownship; 2. Hsinbo Subtownship; 3. Kanpaikti Subtownship; 4. Panwa Subtownship; 5. Shinbwayyan Subtownship
Putao District	1. Kawnglanghpu Township; 2. Machanbaw Township; 3. Nogmung Township; 4. Putao Township; 5. Sumprabum Township; 1. Pannandin Subtownship

=== Sagaing Region ===
Name	List
Hkamti District	1. Hkamti Township; 2. Homalin Township; 3. Lahe Township ^{1}; 4. Leshi Township (Lay Shi) ^{1}; 5. Nanyun Township ^{1}; 1. Donhee Subtownship; 2. Htanparkway Subtownship; 3. Mobaingluk Subtownship; 4. Pansaung Subtownship; 5. Sonemara Subtownship
Kanbalu District	1. Kanbalu Township; 2. Kyunhla Township; 3. Taze Township; 4. Ye-U Township
Kale District	1. Kale Township (Kalemyo); 2. Kalewa Township; 3. Mingin Township
Katha District	1. Banmauk Township; 2. Indaw Township; 3. Katha Township; 4. Tigyaing Township
Kawlin District	1. Kawlin Township; 2. Pinlebu Township; 3. Wuntho Township
Mawlaik District	1. Mawlaik Township; 2. Paungbyin Township
Monywa District	1. Ayadaw Township; 2. Budalin Township; 3. Chaung-U Township; 4. Monywa Township
Sagaing District	1. Myaung Township; 2. Myinmu Township; 3. Sagaing Township
Shwebo District	1. Khin-U Township; 2. Shwebo Township; 3. Wetlet Township; 4. Tabayin Township ^{2}; 1. Kyaukmyaung Subtownship
Tamu District	1. Tamu Township; 1. Khampat Subtownship; 2. Myothit Subtownship
Yinmabin District	1. Kani Township; 2. Pale Township; 3. Salingyi Township; 4. Yinmabin Township

Notes:
^{1} - part of Naga Self-Administered Zone
^{2} - formerly from Monywa District

== South Myanmar ==
=== Kayin State ===
Name	List
Hpa-an District	1. Hlaignbwe Township; 2. Hpa-an Township; 1. Paingkyon Subtownship; 2. Shan Ywathit Subtownship
Hpapun District	1. Hpapun Township; 1. Kamamaung Subtownship
Thandaunggyi District	1. Thandaunggyi Township; 1. Bawgali Subtownship; 2. Leiktho Subtownship
Kawkareik District	1. Kawkareik Township
Kyain Seikgyi District	1. Kyain Seikgyi Township; 1. Kyaidon Subtownship; 2. Payarthonezu Subtownship
Myawaddy District	1. Myawaddy Township; 1. Sukali Subtownship; 2. Wawlaymyaing Subtownship

=== Mon State ===
Name	List
Mawlamyine District	1. Chaungzon Township; 2. Kyaikmaraw Township; 3. Mawlamyine Township; 4. Mudon Township; 5. Thanbyuzayat Township
Kyaikto District	1. Bilin Township; 2. Kyaikto Township
Thaton District	1. Paung Township; 2. Thaton Township
Ye District	1. Ye Township; 1. Khawzar Subtownship; 2. Lamine Subtownship

=== Tanintharyi Region ===
Name	List
Dawei District	1. Dawei Township; 2. Launglon Township; 3. Thayetchaung Township; 4. Yebyu Township; 1. Kaleinaung Subtownship; 2. Myitta Subtownship
Myeik District	1. Kyunsu Township; 2. Myeik Township; 3. Palaw Township; 4. Tanintharyi Township; 1. Palauk Subtownship
Bokepyin District	1. Bokepyin Township; 1. Karathuri Subtownship; 2. Pyigyimandaing Subtownship
Kawthaung District	1. Kawthaung Township; 1. Khamaukgyi Subtownship

== West Myanmar ==
=== Chin State ===
Name	List
Tedim District	1. Tedim Township; 2. Tonzang Township; 1. Cikha Subtownship
Falam District	1. Falam Township; 1. Rikhawdar Subtownship
Hakha District	1. Hakha Township; 2. Thantlang Township
Matupi District	1. Matupi Township; 1. Rezua Subtownship
Mindat District	1. Mindat Township; 2. Kanpetlet Township
Paletwa District	1. Paletwa Township; 1. Sami Subtownship

=== Rakhine State ===
Name	List
Ann District	1. Ann Township
Kyaukpyu District	1. Kyaukpyu Township; 2. Ramree Township
Maungdaw District	1. Buthidaung Township; 2. Maungdaw Township; 1. Taungpyoletwe Subtownship
Mrauk-U District	1. Kyauktaw Township; 2. Minbya Township; 3. Mrauk-U Township; 4. Myebon Township
Sittwe District	1. Pauktaw Township; 2. Ponnagyun Township; 3. Rathedaung Township; 4. Sittwe Township
Taungup District	1. Taungup Township; 2. Manaung Township; 1. Maei Subtownship
Thandwe District	1. Thandwe Township; 2. Gwa Township; 1. Kyeintali Subtownship
