= Wa Self-Administered Division =

Wa Self-Administered Division ဝ ကိုယ်ပိုင်အုပ်ချုပ်ခွင့်ရ တိုင်း
- Self-administered division
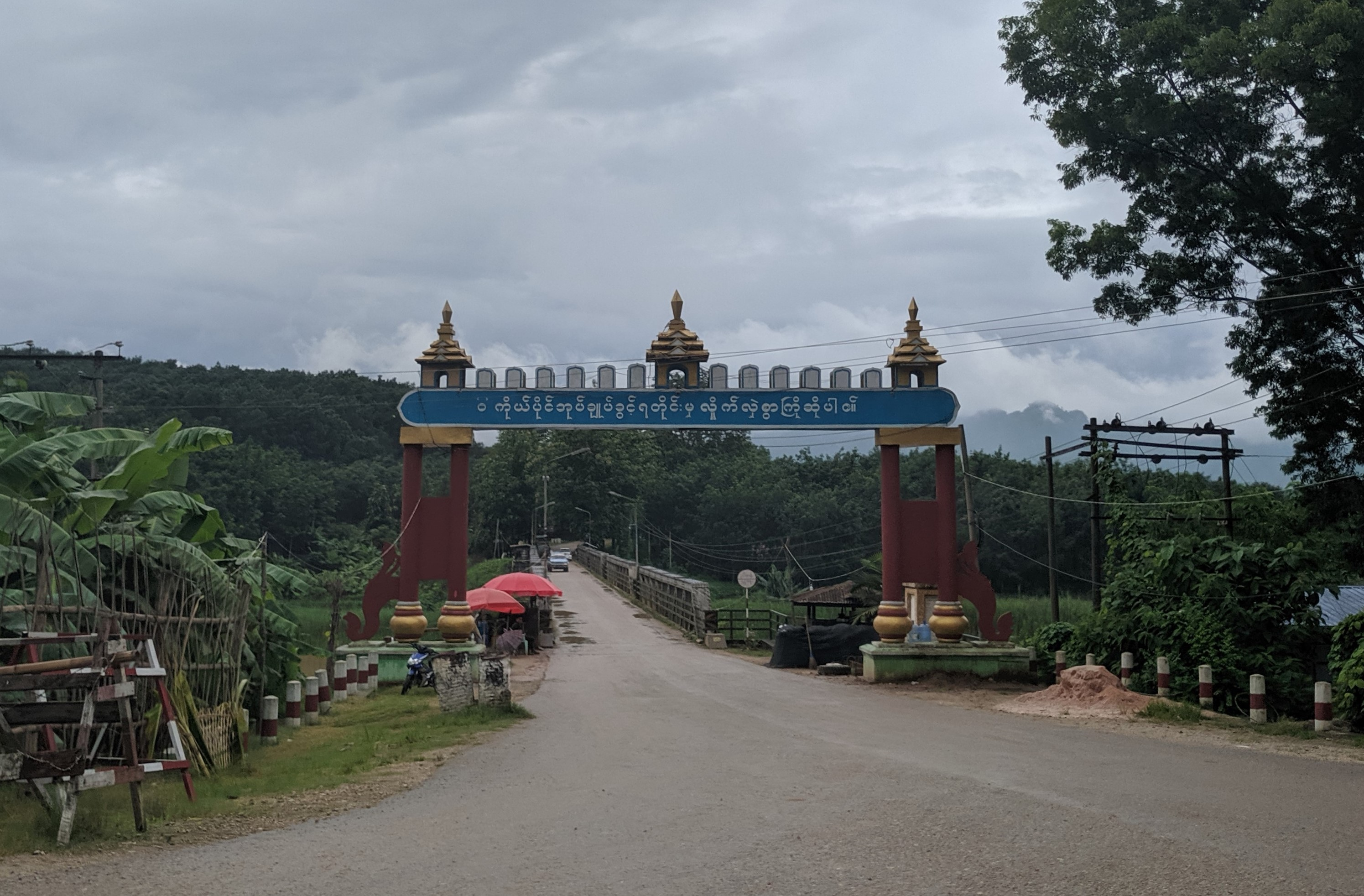

- Location in Shan State
- Coordinates: 21°55′00″N 98°50′00″E
- Country: Myanmar
- State: Shan State
- Created: 20 August 2010
- De facto ceased: January 2024
- Capital: Matman

Government
  - Chairman of the Leading Body: vacant

Area
  - Total: 12,433 km^{2} (4,800 sq mi)
- Elevation: 524 m (1,719 ft)

Population
  - Total: 558,000
- Demonym: Wa
- Time zone: UTC+6:30 (MMT)

The Wa Self-Administered Division (Burmese: ဝ ကိုယ်ပိုင်အုပ်ချုပ်ခွင့်ရ တိုင်း [wa̰ kòbàɪɰ̃ ʔoʊʔtɕʰoʊʔ kʰwɪ̰ɰ̃ja̰ táɪɰ̃]; Chinese: 佤自治州; Wade–Giles: Wa Tzŭ-chih-chou) is an autonomous, self-administered division of Myanmar. Its official name was announced by decree on 20 August 2010.

Myanmar's government declared the area to be administered by the Wa people, under the official name Wa Special Region 2. Its territory is partly under the control of the de facto independent Wa State. Hopang and Pan Lon were directly controlled by the Tatmadaw until their transfer to Wa State in January 2024.

== Administrative divisions ==
The Wa Self-administered Division is the only self-administered division of Myanmar. It exists at an administrative level half-a-step below that of states, regions and the union territory as it is part of the first-order administrative division of Shan State, but itself contains two second-order administrative divisions with Hopang District and Matman District..

As stipulated by the 2008 constitution, the administrative region consisted of the following townships in Shan State:

- Matman District
  - Matman Township (Metman)
  - Namphan Township (Nahpan)
  - Pangsang Township (Pangkham)
    - Man Kan Subtownship
- Hopang District
  - Hopang Township
    - Namtit Subtownship
    - Panlong Subtownship
  - Mongmao Township
  - Pangwaun Township (Panwai)

== Leadership ==
- Khun Tun Lu (30 Mar 2011 – 1 Feb 2021)
- Nyi Nat (2 Feb 2021 – Jan 2024)

== Government and Politics ==
The Leading Body of the Wa Self-Administered Division (LBWSAD) is the executive and legislative body responsible for governing, administering, and legislating for the Wa Self-Administered Division. The body is led by the Chairman of the Leading Body.

The Leading Body has the power and authority for 10 areas of governance including public health, fire hazard prevention, water and electricity matters, etc. These powers were delegated to it by Schedule Three - List of Legislation of the Leading Body of Self-Administered Division or Self-Administered Area of the 2008 Constitution of Myanmar.

== See also ==
- Wa States
