= Hopang District =

- District
- Location in Shan State
- Coordinates: 23°25′00″N 98°45′00″E
- Country: Myanmar
- State: Shan State
- Self-administered division: Wa
- Elevation: 482 m (1,581 ft)
- Time zone: UTC+6.30 (MST)

Hopang District is a district of Shan State, Myanmar (Burma). It is part of the Wa Self-Administered Division. It was set up in 2011 and consists of three townships, Hopang, Mongmai and Pangwan, and two subtownships, Namtit and Panlong.

== History ==
Prior to the 2008 Constitution of Myanmar, Hopang District also included Matman, Namphan and Pangsang townships, which formed to become Matman District.
