= Wa people =

Ethnic group in northern Myanmar

Wa (Va, Ava, Parauk, Ba rāog) 佤族
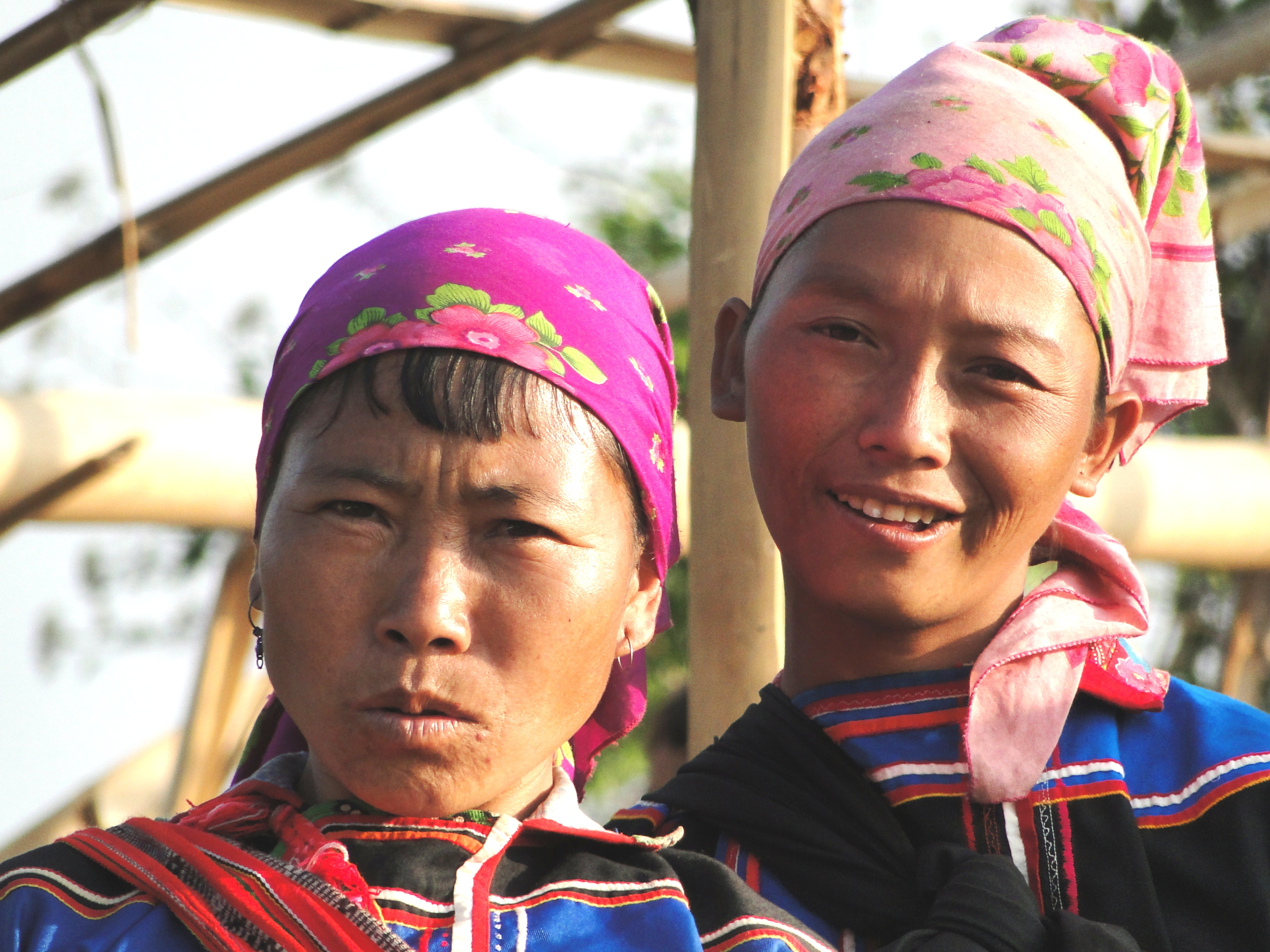
- Two Wa women in traditional clothing

Total population
- approx. 1.2 million

Regions with significant populations
- Myanmar; ∟Shan State; ∟Kachin State: 800,000
- China; ∟Yunnan: 430,997 (2020 census)
- Thailand; ∟Chiang Rai: 10,000

Languages
- Wa; Secondary languages: Southwestern Mandarin; Burmese

Religion
- Animism; Buddhism; Christianity

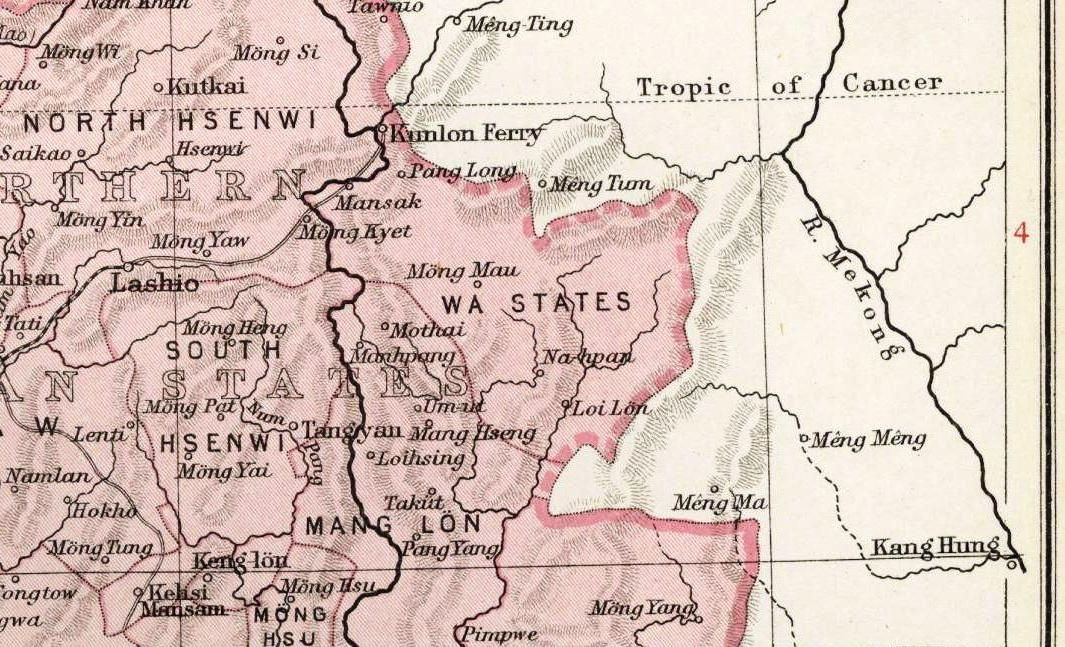
The Wa States in an early 20th century Imperial Gazetteer of India map

The Wa people (Wa: Vāx; Burmese: ဝလူမျိုး, [wa̰ lùmjóʊ]; Chinese: 佤族; pinyin: Wǎzú; Thai: ว้า Wáa) are a Southeast Asian ethnic group that lives mainly in northern Myanmar, in the northern part of Shan State and the eastern part of Kachin State, near and along Myanmar's border with China, as well as in China's Yunnan Province.

Historically, the Wa have inhabited the Wa States, a territory that they have claimed as their ancestral land since time immemorial. It is a rugged, mountainous area located between the Mekong and the Salween River, with the Nam Hka flowing across it. The Wa traditionally practiced subsistence agriculture by cultivating rice, peas, beans, poppies, and walnuts. They bred water buffaloes, which they used mainly for sacrificial purposes. Generally, the traditional customs of the Wa, as well as their lifestyle, are very similar to those of the Naga people further to the Northwest. The Wa people speak the Wa language which is part of the Austroasiatic language family.

Many of the Wa are animists and a small proportion of the population follows a derivative of either Buddhism or Christianity.

== Cultural history ==
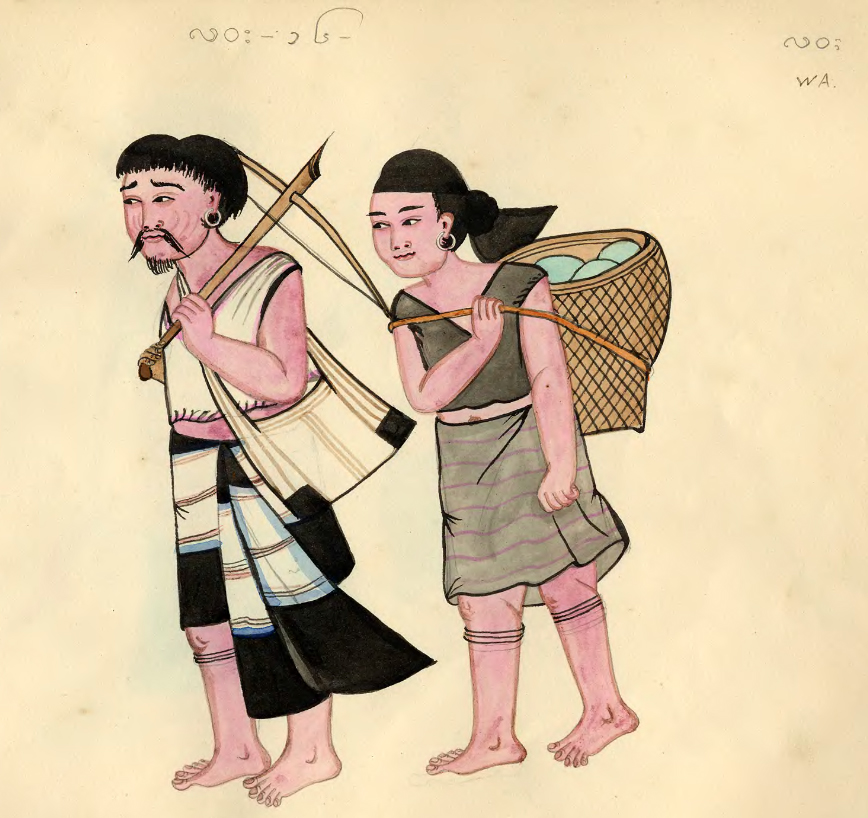
An early Burmese depiction of Wa

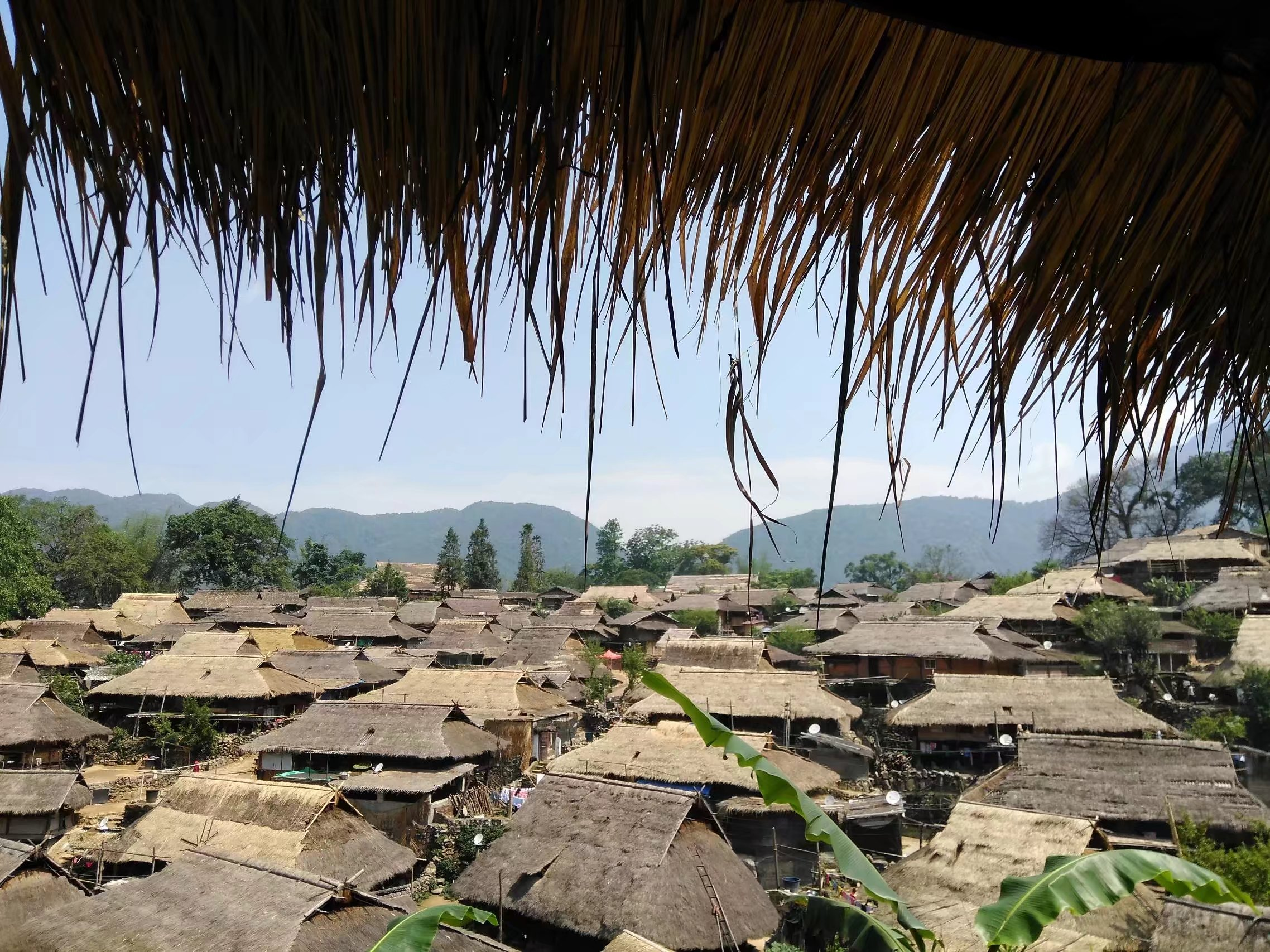
Om Diem, a Wa village in Cangyuan Va Autonomous County, Yunnan

British journalist and colonial administrator Sir George Scott described how in the Wa origin narratives the first Wa originated from two female ancestors Ya Htawm and Ya Htai who spent their early phase as tadpoles (rairoh) in a small lake known as Nawng Hkaeo. The lake is located in the northeastern Wa territory in the border area between China and Myanmar.

Very little is known about the early history of the Wa. What is known is mostly composed of local narratives telling that in the distant past, the historical Wa States and all the territories of eastern Shan State, as well as large swathes of the adjacent areas of present-day China had belonged to the Wa. In the area of the former Kengtung State the Wa were displaced around 1229 and were later defeated by King Mangrai. During British rule in Burma, the Shan were the majority in Kengtung state, with other groups such as the Akha and Lahu forming sizable communities. The Wa now form a minority of only about 10% in Kengtung District despite having been the original inhabitants.

The Wa originally had animist religious beliefs centered around ritual blood sacrifices. Villages had a spirit healer (Tax Cao Chai) and the traditional way of dealing with sickness or other problems was to sacrifice a chicken, a pig or a larger animal, depending on the magnitude of the affliction. According to local legend, the practice of cutting a human head was intended as a ritual sacrifice in order to improve the fertility of the rice fields. Traditional villages had also shrines (Nyiex Moeg) where a buffalo was sacrificed once every year at a special Y-shaped post named Khaox Si Gang with an offering of the blood, meat and skin performed at it. Additionally, among the traditional spirit-worshiping Wa—a practice that still exists among the Christian Wa—animals were sacrificed at festivities like weddings and funerary rituals. However, the Wa that were under Buddhist influence developed different traditions.

In the traditional Wa society monogamous marriage was the norm and there was sexual freedom for both men and women before marriage. The chewing of betel with areca nut was formerly also an important custom. The Wa have different kinds of traditional dances. One important dance in their culture is accompanied by the beating of a large hollow wooden drum. This way of dancing, among other Wa dances such as the hair dance and festivals, is being promoted as a tourist attraction by the Yunnan tourism authorities in China. The Wa Women's Association also promotes dance, as well as other cultural and philanthropic activities.

=== Language and script ===
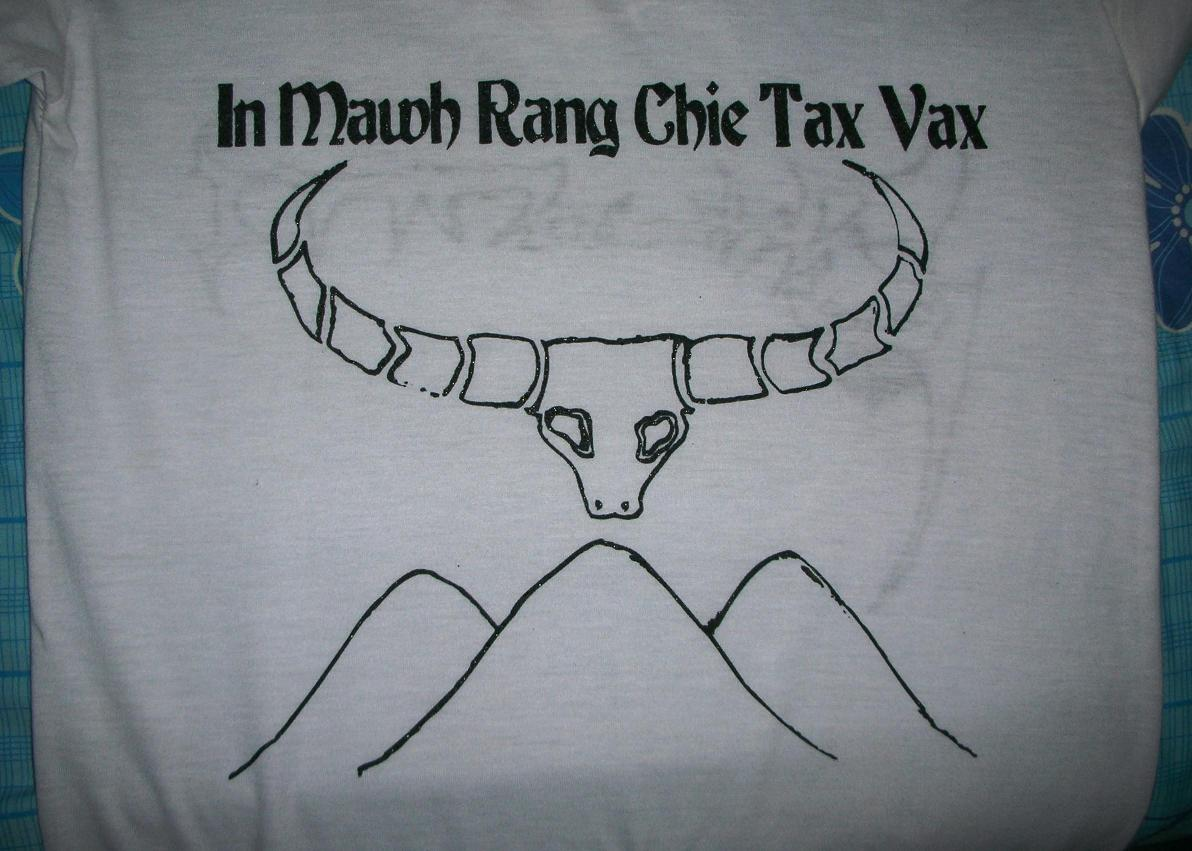
Wa writing and cultural symbols on a T-shirt

The Wa language forms a language group belonging to the Palaungic branch of the Austroasiatic language family. It formerly had no script and the few Wa who were literate used Chinese characters, while others used the Shan language and its script. Christian missionary work among the Wa began at the beginning of the 20th century first in the Burmese and later in the Chinese areas of the Wa territory. It was led by William Marcus Young of Nebraska. The first transcription of the Wa language was devised by Young and Sara Yaw Shu Chin in 1931 with the purpose of translating the Bible. This first Wa alphabet was based on the Latin script and the first publication was a compilation of Wa hymns in 1933, the Wa New Testament being completed in 1938. This transcription, known as "Bible orthography" is known as "老佤文" (lǎowǎwén; 'old Wa orthography') in Chinese, and is now used mainly in the Burmese Wa areas and among the Wa in Thailand. A revised Bible orthography has been adopted as "official Wa spelling" by the authorities of the Wa Self-Administered Division in Pangkham, which has published a series of primers in order to improve the literacy of the United Wa State Army troops. Also, after 2000 Wa people in social networks such as Facebook and other online media, as well as Wa songwriters in karaoke lyrics of Wa songs use this Myanmar (revised Bible) "official Wa orthography" in its main variations.

In China, a transcription adapted to the new pinyin romanization, known as "PRC orthography" or "China official orthography", was developed for the Wa people in 1956. However, its publications, mainly propagated through the Yunnan administration, are yet to reach a wider public beyond academics. This new Wa alphabet is treated as the first formal script of the Wa.

The Western Lawa are officially considered part of the Wa minority in China and are also known as 'tame Wa'.

=== British rule and enduring prejudices ===
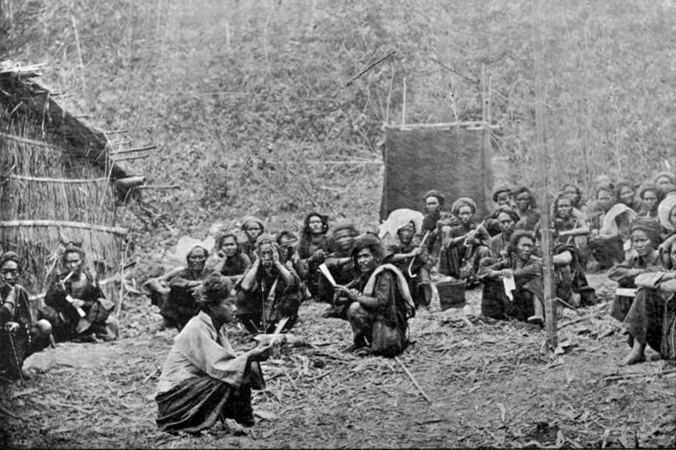
Wa headmen in British Burma.

Very little has been written about the Wa people except in the Chinese language. The area where they live had been traditionally administered by a Saopha, a Shan hereditary chief. In the second half of the 19th century, the British authorities in Burma judged the Wa territory remote and of difficult access. Thus, excepting Mang Lon where the Saopha resided, the British left the Wa State without administration, its border with China undefined. That situation suited the Wa well, for throughout their history they had consistently preferred being left alone.

The Wa were largely portrayed by colonial administrators as wild and dirty people owing to their practice of headhunting. However, Chinese documents written before the twentieth century rarely mentioned the Wa as headhunters and yet it is this aspect of Wa culture that has been cited more than any other in order to emphasize the primitiveness of the Wa.

The prejudice continues in modern times when the Wa, who are economically not that different from other ethnic hill tribes in the area, such as the Lahu people, are largely known for their rebel army and as being involved in drug trafficking, overshadowing other aspects of their culture.

=== Post World War II ===
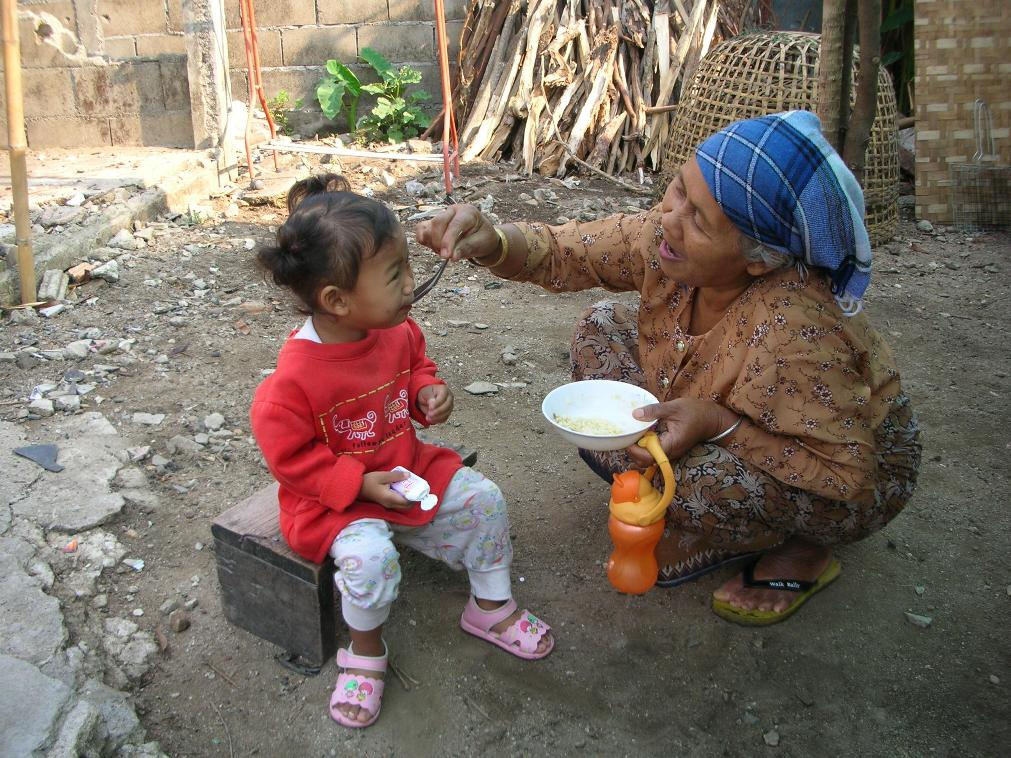
Wa woman feeding a little girl

The international border that had been defined between Burma and China left the Wa people divided between the two countries. The Wa regions in Burma were largely left alone until the 1950s, when remnants of Chiang Kai-shek's National Revolutionary Army fled the 1949 Chinese Communist Revolution. A decade and a half later, the region was under the influence of the Communist Party of Burma, which was very active in the area. During that time, opium cultivation and sales grew and the ancient traditional life became disrupted, but an administrative system that collected revenue and maintained a significant armed force, as well as a rudimentary infrastructure, ushered the Wa region into the modern era.

In 1989 the Wa authorities expelled the Burma Communist Party and negotiated a cease-fire with the then leader of Burma's military junta Khin Nyunt. They founded the United Wa State Army and United Wa State Party with a centralized command. In return for agreeing to the ban of poppy cultivation and opium production the region experienced a massive influx of international development aid. The Wa Special Region 2 was created within the northeastern Shan State, with its de facto capital in Pangkham.

=== Military activity and drug production ===
The United Wa State Army was one of the world's largest narco-armies, with up to 10,000 men under arms. Until 1996, the UWSA was involved in a conflict against the Mong Tai Army which suited the objectives of the Tatmadaw in the area. During this conflict, the Wa army occupied areas close to the Thai border, ending up with the control of two separate swathes of territory north and south of Kengtung. In 1999, when the Burmese military requested the Wa fighters to return to the northern area the UWSA refused.

During the 1990s the areas controlled by the UWSA were involved in heroin production. During the 2000s, the United Wa State Army shifted focus into amphetamine production. Records of official seizures compiled by the United Nations suggest that in 2006 Myanmar was the source of half of Asia's methamphetamine, known in Thailand as yaba, and some experts postulate that most drug labs are in areas under Wa control.

== Geographic distribution ==
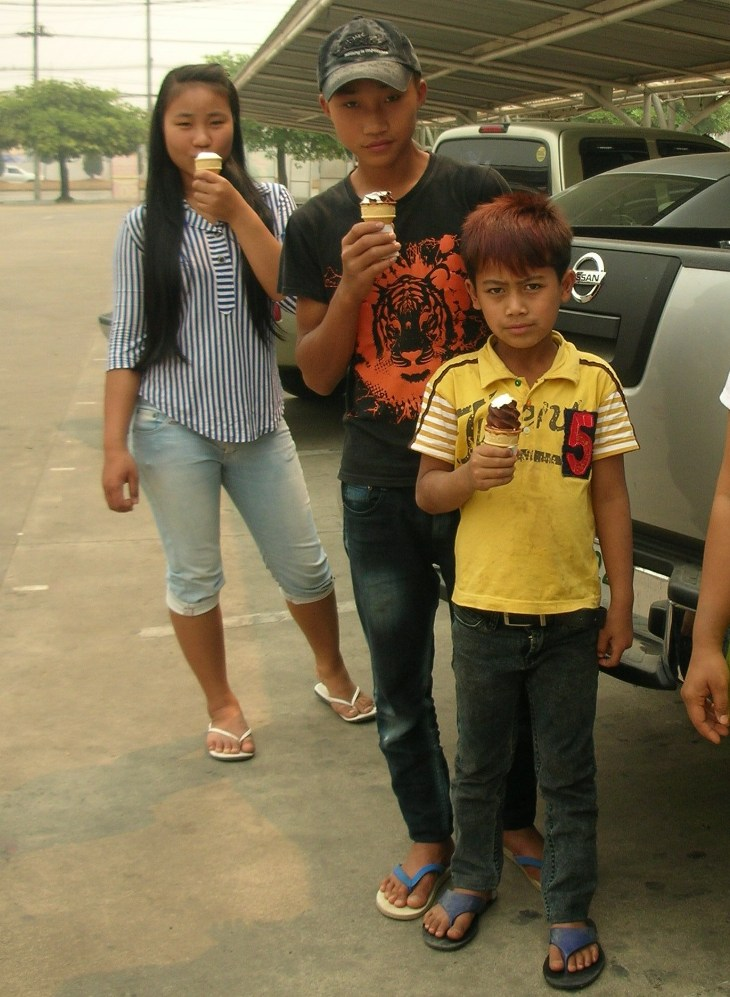
Young Wa people from Pyinghsai, near Kengtung

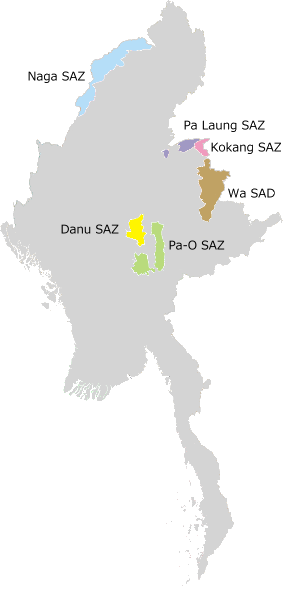
A map of Burma showing the Wa Self-Administered Division, coloured brown.

The land where the Wa have traditionally living is divided between Burma and China. The international border cuts the ancestral Wa region roughly in half.

=== China ===
The Wa are one of the 56 ethnic groups officially recognized by China. In China, the Wa live in compact communities in the Ximeng Va Autonomous County (in Wa: Mēng Ka or Si Moung), Cangyuan Va Autonomous County, Menglian Dai, Lahu and Va Autonomous County (Gaeng Līam), Gengma Dai and Va Autonomous County (Gaeng Mīex or Gaeng Māx), Lincang (Mēng Lām), Shuangjiang Lahu, Va, Blang and Dai Autonomous County (Si Nblāeng or Mēng Mēng), Zhenkang County, and Yongde County in southwestern Yunnan. Their population in China is estimated at 400,000.

==== Benren ====
The "Benren" (本人) of Yongde County and Zhenkang County, Yunnan are officially classified as Wa by the Chinese government, but consider themselves to be a separate ethnicity from the Wa. Their autonym is "Siwa" (斯佤). The Benren are distributed in:

- Menggong Township 勐汞佤族乡 (recently incorporated into Dedang Town 德党镇), Yongde County: in Menggong 勐汞, Daba 大坝, Songlin 松林, Dapingzhang 大平掌, Hunai 户乃, Xiaodifang 小地方, Lielie 列列. There are 10,289 Benren in the township as of 2010.
- Desili Township 德思里彝族佤族乡, Fengqing County
- Mangka Township 芒卡镇, Cangyuan Va Autonomous County

=== Burma ===
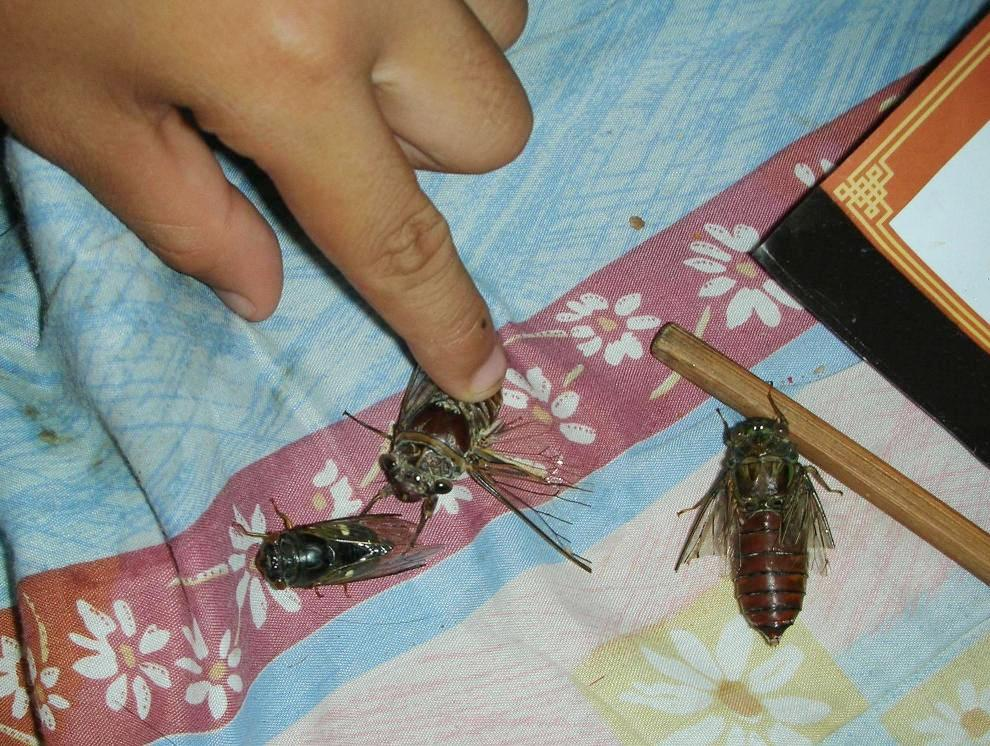
Cicadas caught by Wa people in order to crush them with chilies in a mixture similar to the Thai Nam phrik

The Wa are one of the 135 officially recognized ethnic groups of Myanmar. Their proportion to Myanmar's total population is 0.16. Although little is known about the ancient history of the Wa, they are acknowledged by other dominant ethnic groups in Shan State, such as the Tai Yai, to be the original inhabitants of the area.

In Burma, the Wa live mostly in small villages near Kengtung and north and northeastwards close to the Chinese border, as well as a small area east of Tachileik. The Wa Special Region 2 of the Northern Shan State or Wa State was formed by the United Wa State Army (UWSA) and the remains of the former Burmese Communist Party rebel group that collapsed in 1989. The Wa State and the UWSA are in a fragile cease-fire agreement with the Burmese military government. They have been accused by Western governments of involvement in drug trafficking but have banned opium production since 2005 and have received United Nations aid in improving legitimate agriculture.

As stipulated by the 2008 Burmese Constitution, on 20 August 2010 the Wa Self-Administered Division has been established. It is set to be administered by the Wa people and its territory is between the gorges of the Mekong and Salween, in the east part of the Shan State, near the border with the Chinese province of Yunnan.

=== Thailand ===
In recent times some Wa communities from Burma have crossed the border and settled in Thailand, where they have no official status as a Hill Tribe. The Wa live mainly in the Mae Sai District and Mae Yao subdistrict of Chiang Rai Province, as well as in Wiang Pa Pao District in southern Chiang Rai Province and Chiang Dao District in Chiang Mai Province. In Thailand the Wa having come recently from Burma are often referred to as 'Lawa', although they do not strictly belong to the latter ethnic subgroup.

== See also ==
- Pangkham

== Bibliography ==
- "A Bibliography of materials in or about Wa language and culture". SOAS.
- "A special issue on the Wa people". Journal of Burma Studies. 17 (1). 2013. Archived from the original on 2019-07-16.
- Harvey, G. E. (1933). Wa Précis. Rangoon.
- Lintner, Bertil (1999). Burma in Revolt: Opium and Insurgency Since 1948. Chiang Mai.
- Marshall, Andrew (2002). The Trouser People: A Story of Burma in the Shadow of the Empire. London: Penguin. ISBN 1-58243-120-5.
- Mitton, Geraldine (1936). Scott of the Shan Hills. London: John Murray.
- Scott, J. G. (1932). Burma and Beyond. London.
- Scott, J. G. (1900–1901). Gazetteer of Upper Burma and the Shan States. Vol. 5 vols. Rangoon.
- Winnington, Alan (1959). The Slaves of the Cool Mountains. Berlin: Seven Seas.
- Winnington, Alan (1959). The Slaves of the Cool Mountains: The Ancient Social Conditions and Changes Now in Progress on the Remote South-Western Borders of China. London: Lawrence & Wishart.
- Fiskesjö, Magnus (2013). "Introduction to Wa Studies". Journal of Burma Studies. 17 (1): 1–27.
- Fiskesjö, Magnus (2009). "The Autonomy of Naming: Kinship, Power and Ethnonymy in the Wa Lands of the Southeast Asia-China Frontiers". In Macdonald, Charles; Zheng, Yangwen (eds.). Personal Names in Asia: History, Culture and Identity. Singapore: Singapore University Press. pp. 150–74. ISBN 9971-69-380-1.
- Fiskesjö, Magnus (2011). "Slavery as the Commodification of People: Wa 'Slaves' and Their Chinese 'Sisters'". Focaal-Journal of Global and Historical Anthropology. 59: 3–18.
- Fiskesjö, Magnus (2010). "Mining, History, and the Anti-State Wa: The Politics of Autonomy between Burma and China". Journal of Global History. 5 (2): 241–64.
- Fiskesjö, Magnus (2010). "Participant Intoxication and Self-Other Dynamics in the Wa Context". The Asia Pacific Journal of Anthropology. 11 (2): 111–27.
- Fiskesjö, Magnus (2021). Stories from an Ancient Land: Perspectives on Wa History and Culture. Berghahn Books. ISBN 9781789208870.
- Takano, Hideyuki (2002). The Shore Beyond Good and Evil: A Report from Inside Burma's Opium Kingdom. Tokyo: Kotan Publishing.
- Kramer, Tom (2007). The United Wa State Party: Narco-army or Ethnic Nationalist Party?. Washington, DC: East-West Center Washington.
- Kramer, Tom (2009). From Golden Triangle to Rubber Belt?: The Future of Opium Bans in the Kokang and Wa Regions. Amsterdam: Transnational Institute.

=== Fiction ===
- Scott, J. G. (1913). In the Grip of the Wild Wa. London.
- Winnington, Alan (1983). Kopfjäger. Roman-Zeitung; Heft 398 (in German). Translated by K. Heinz. Berlin: Verlag Volk und Welt.
