= Hsenwi Township =

Hsenwi Township သိန္နီမြို့နယ်
- Township
- Hseni Township
- Location in Lashio district
- Coordinates: 23°18′0″N 97°57′0″E
- Country: Myanmar
- State: Shan State
- District: Lashio District
- Elevation: 632 m (2,073 ft)

Population (2019)
  - Total: 55,948
- Time zone: UTC+6:30 (MMT)

Hsenwi Township, also known as Hseni or Theinni (Burmese: သိန္နီမြို့နယ်), is a township of Lashio District in the Shan State, Myanmar. It shares the borders with Kutkai Township in the north, Kunlong Township in the east, Lashio Township in the south and Namtu Township in the west. Its area is 1,224.8 square kilometres (472.89 sq mi). There are 4 wards and 32 village-tracts. Total population was about 50,000 in 2009. The principal town is Hsenwi.

== Description ==
The climate is tropical and average annual rainfall is 1,300 millimetres (50 in). Namtu, Namle and Namsalat are main creeks and they stream from east to west. The principal town is Hsenwi.

Teak, chestnut, sweet chestnut, lacquer trees, Cassia siamea, magnolia, mango, jackfruit, guava trees, bananas, lychee, green tea and oranges are grown. Paddy, corn, soya bean, ground nut, pigeon peas, sesame, belleric myrobalan, sunflower, rubber, sugarcane, chili, potato and coffee are also grown. It has 20,858 hectares (51,542 acres) of cultivable land, 1,470 hectares (3,640 acres) of un-cultivable land, 27,266 hectares (67,375 acres) of virgin and vacant land and 8,021 hectares (19,821 acres) of reserved forests and protected forest. Buffalo, cow, pig, chicken, fish were breed in the township.

There are 1 high school, 4 high school branches, 1 middle school, 7 post primary schools and 50 primary schools.

There are 1 25-bedded hospital, 2 16-bedded hospitals, 3 rural health clinics and 12 rural health clinics (branches). One of 16-bedded hospitals is in Sanlaung Village. It has been commissioned since October 2004.

== Transport ==
Hsenwi has a station on the standard gauge Kunming, China - Kyaukphyu port railway.
