= Meung Yum language =

Waic language of Myanmar

Meung Yum
- Region: Myanmar
- Native speakers: 8,000 (2013)
- Language family: Austroasiatic: Khasi–Palaungic; Palaungic; Waic; Wa; Meung Yum

Language codes
- ISO 639-3: None (mis)
- Glottolog: None

Meung Yum is a Waic language spoken by about 8,000 people in Kunlong Township, Shan State, Myanmar.

Comparing Meung Yum data from Namt Yoke, Loi Yang, Pang Wan, and Pan Tang villages, Phung Wei Ping (2013) has determined Meung Yum to be a variety of Wa.

== Names ==
Other names for Meung Yum include Kon Loi, Loi, Wa Chu, Wa, Awa, and La.

== Demographics ==
Meung Yum speakers live in Kunlong Township (with 21 Meung Yum villages) and Hopang Township (with 30 Meung Yum villages), with each township having about an equal number of speakers.

Nine villages have only Meung Yum people:

- Kunlong Township
  - Namt Yoke
  - Pang Khaw
  - Pang Wan
  - Man Pein
  - Pa Paw
  - Kaung Sang
  - Man Kan
- Wa State
  - Meung Yum
  - Noat Awng

Meung Yum dialects are Kaung Sar, Pan Tan, Man Kyu, Man Phan, Namt Yoke, Man Pein, Kaung Sang, and Man Kan. Phung Wei Ping (2013) also lists Loi Yang, Pang Wan, and Pan Tang.

== See also ==
- Savaiq language

== Works cited ==
- Myint Myint Phyu (2013). A Sociolinguistic Survey of Selected Meung Yum and Savaiq Varieties (PDF) (M.A. thesis). Payap University. Archived from the original (PDF) on 2016-10-20.
- Phung Wei Ping (2013). A Phonological Description of Meung Yum and Phonological Comparison of Meung Yum with Three Wa Dialects in China (PDF) (M.A. thesis). Payap University. Archived from the original (PDF) on 2015-01-29.
