= Mhine Ohn Khaing =

Burmese politician

Member of the Amyotha Hluttaw
- Incumbent
- Assumed office 1 February 2016
- Constituency: Shan State No.11
- Majority: 37545 votes

Personal details
- Born: 1 January 1961 (age 65) Shan State, Burma (Myanmar)
- Party: Ta'ang National Party
- Spouse: Yi Yi Khin
- Parent(s): Aung Tun (father); Shwe Oo (mother)
- Education: Mandalay University; Lashio University

Mhine Ohn Khaing (Burmese: မိုင်းအုဏ်းခိုင်; born 1 January 1961) is a Burmese politician who currently serves as a House of Nationalities member of parliament for Shan State No. 11 constituency.

== Early life and education ==
He was born on 1 January 1961 in Shan State, Burma (Myanmar). He graduated with Dip.Ag., B.Sc. and H.G.P. from Lashio University and Mandalay University.

== Political career ==
He is a member of the Ta'ang National Party. In the 2015 Myanmar general election, he was elected as an Amyotha Hluttaw MP, winning a majority 37545 votes and elected representative from Shan State No. 11 parliamentary constituency. He also serves as a member of Amyotha Hluttaw Health, Sports and Culture Committee.
