= Savaiq language =

Waic language of Shan State, Burma

Savaiq
- Region: Burma
- Native speakers: 10,000 (2013)
- Language family: Austroasiatic: Khasi–Palaungic; Palaungic; Waic; Savaiq

Language codes
- ISO 639-3: None (mis)
- Glottolog: None

Savaiq is a Waic language spoken in Kunlong Township, Shan State, Burma.

The exact number of Savaiq speakers is unknown, but may possibly be around 10,000. Savaiq speakers are distributed in Kunlong, Mong Maw, and Lashio townships in Shan State, Burma.

== Names ==
Savaiq means 'swallow (bird)'. Other names for Savaiq include:

- Ming Yum
- Loi
- Loi Meung Yum
- Khala
- Laca
- Loi Lah
- Leh Nu
- La Leit

== Dialects ==
Dialects are Man Gyat and Thein Tan.

== See also ==
- Meung Yum language
