= Kunlong =

Town in Shan State, Myanmar

Kunlong ကွမ်းလုံမြို့
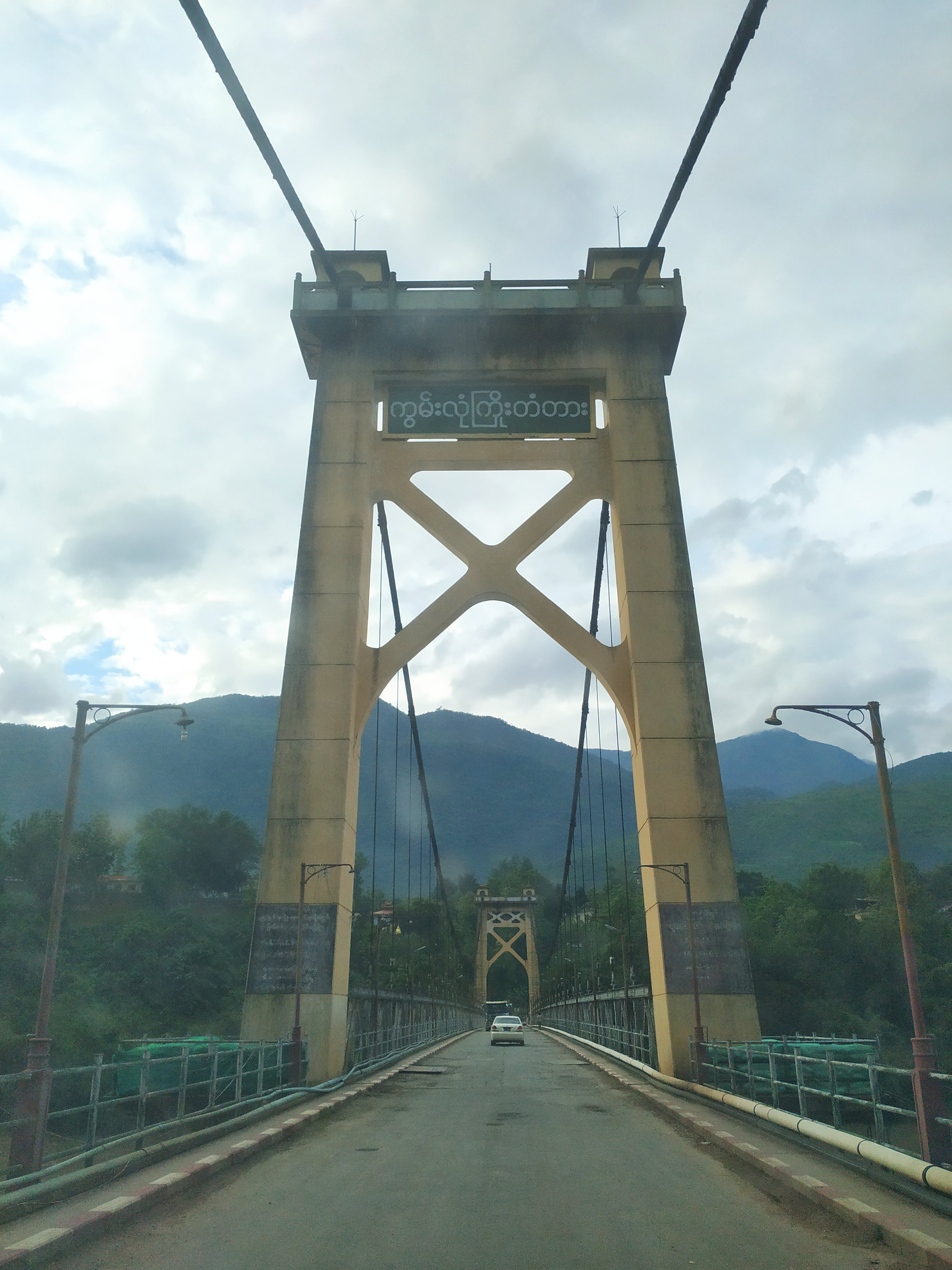
- Kunlong suspension bridge

- Location in Burma
- Coordinates: 23°25′00″N 98°39′00″E
- Country: Myanmar
- Division: Shan State
- District: Lashio District
- Township: Kunlong Township

Area
  - Total: 0.375 sq mi (0.971 km^{2})
- Elevation: 1,578.08 ft (481.00 m)

Population (2019)
  - Total: 5,116
  - Density: 13,600/sq mi (5,270/km^{2})
  - Ethnicities: Kokang; Wa
- Time zone: UTC+6.30 (MST)

Kunlong (Burmese: ကွမ်းလုံ) is the capital town of Kunlong Township in Shan State. its coordination is 23 25' 00" N and 98 39' 00" E.

The Wa people inhabit the hills immediately overlooking the Nam Ting valley. The town is divided into 6 wards.

== History ==
It is the home of Kunlong Bridge over the Salween River. There was a 42 days-long battle between Burma Communist Party (BCP) and Myanmar Army from November 1971 to January 1972 to control that strategic bridge.

On 9 November 2023, during Operation 1027, the Myanmar National Democratic Alliance Army (MNDAA) was able to capture the town of Kunlong and its bridge during the ongoing civil war.
