= Taunggyi University =

Higher education institute in Shan State, Myanmar

Coordinates: 20°45′19″N 97°3′3″E

- တောင်ကြီး တက္ကသိုလ်
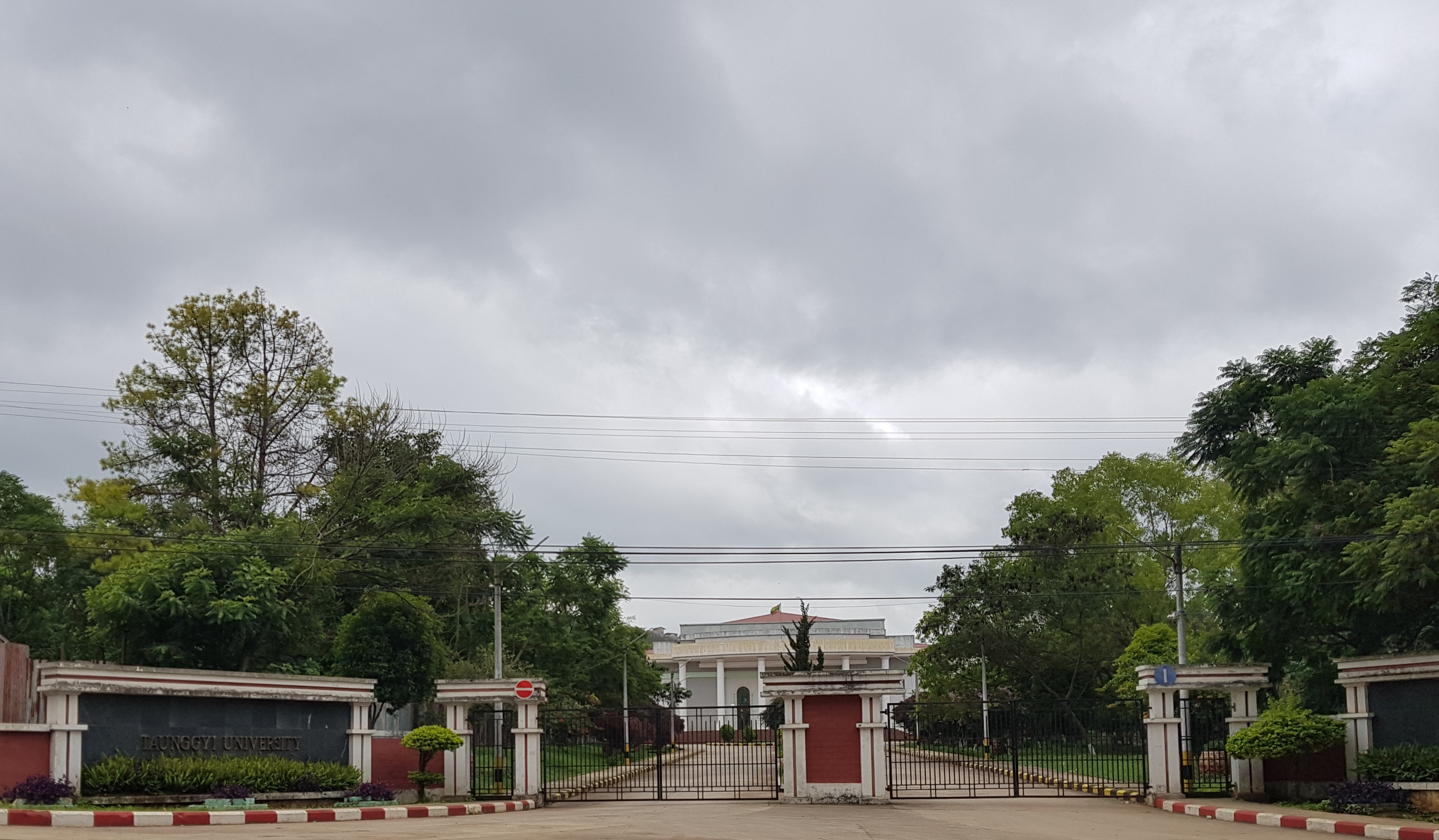
- Type: Public
- Established: 15 June 1961; 65 years ago
- Rector: Dr. Kay Thi Thin
- Administrative staff: 245
- Students: 14,000
- Location: Taunggyi 06011; Shan State, Myanmar

Taunggyi University (Burmese: တောင်ကြီး တက္ကသိုလ် [tàʊɰ̃dʑí tɛʔkəθò]), located in Taunggyi, is the main university in Shan State, Myanmar. The university offers bachelor's and master's degree programs in arts and sciences.

== History ==
The institution was established on 15 June 1961, as Taunggyi College, an affiliated college of Mandalay University. Per the University Education Act of 1964, it became Taunggyi Degree College, still under the purview of Mandalay University. It became an independent university on 17 August 1992, drawing most of its students from Shan State.

== Programs ==
Taunggyi University's main offerings are Bachelor of Arts and Bachelor of Science degrees, although it reportedly also offers some master's and doctorate level degrees.
