= Waic languages =

Subgroup of the Austroasiatic language family

Waic
- Geographic distribution: Burma, China
- Ethnicity: Wa people
- Linguistic classification: Austroasiatic: Khasi–Palaungic; Palaungic; Waic

Language codes
- Glottolog: waic1245

The Waic languages are spoken in the Shan State of Myanmar, in Northern Thailand, and in the Yunnan province of China.

== Classification ==
Gérard Diffloth reconstructed Proto-Waic in a 1980 paper. His classification is as follows (Sidwell 2009). (Note: Individual languages are highlighted in italics.)

- Waic
  - Samtau (later renamed "Blang" by Diffloth)
    - Samtau
  - Wa–Lawa–La
    - Wa proper
      - Wa
    - Lawa
      - Bo Luang
      - Umphal

The recently discovered Meung Yum and Savaiq languages of Shan State, Burma also belong to the Wa language cluster.

Other Waic languages in Shan State, eastern Myanmar are En and Siam (Hsem), which are referred to by Scott (1900) as En and Son. Hsiu (2015) classifies En, Son, and Tai Loi in Scott (1900) as Waic languages, citing the Waic phonological innovation from Proto-Palaungic *s- > h- instead of the Angkuic phonological innovation from Proto-Palaungic *s- > s-.
