= Battle of Kunlong =

The Battle of Kunlong was a 42-day military confrontation between the armed forces of the Communist Party of Burma and the Burmese Army, which took place between November 1971 and January 1972. During the battle, the communist forces sought to capture the Kunlong bridge over the Salween River (a point of high strategic value). However, the human wave attacks (a tactic borrowed from China) of the communists proved ineffective against the entrenched Burmese Army forces. The battle ended in a defeat for the communists, the only major military set-back for the Communist Party of Burma during this phase of the armed conflict.

== See also ==
- Communist Party of Burma#North-East Command
