= Kay Thi Thin =

Burmese physicist

- ကေသီသင်

Pro-rector of the University of Mandalay
- Incumbent
- Assumed office 16 March 2020

Pro-rector of Meiktila University

Personal details
- Born: Myanmar
- Occupation: Physicist, Professor, Pro-rector

Kay Thi Thin is a Burmese physicist and a pro-rector of Mandalay University. She takes responsibility for the administration sector of the university. She previously served as a pro-rector of Meiktila University, and professor and head of physics departments of Lashio University and Myeik University.

== Career ==
Kay Thi Thin conferred her PhD degree in the field of Nuclear Physics from the University of Yangon in 2002. She was appointed as a pro-rector of Mandalay University on 16 March 2020.
