= Nga Phe Chaung =

Oldest monastery on Inle Lake, Shan State

Nga Phe Kyaung
- ငါးဖယ်ချောင်းကျောင်းတိုက်
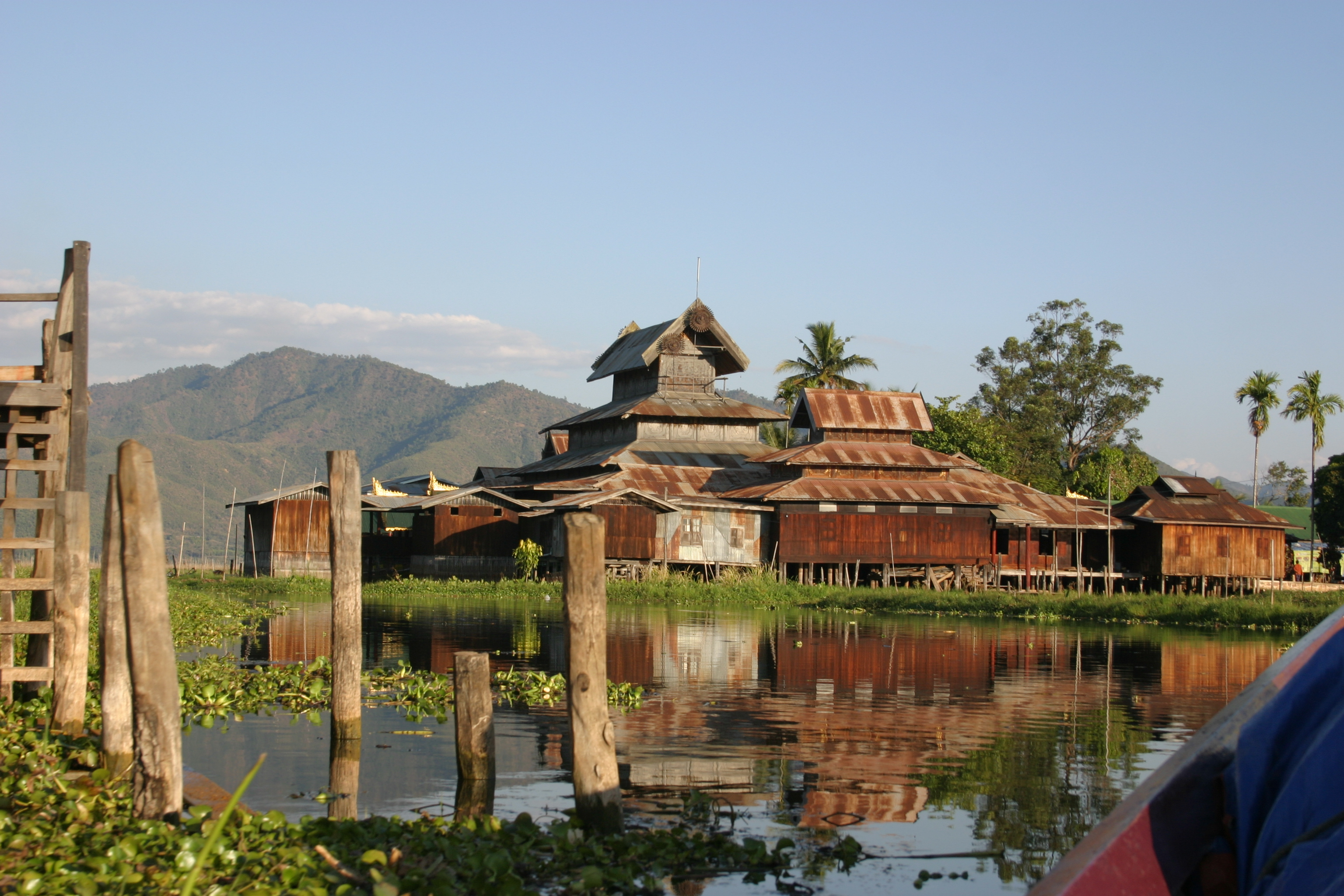
- Nga Phe Kyaung monastery

- Location within Myanmar

Religion
- Affiliation: Buddhism
- Sect: Theravada Buddhism
- Region: Shan State
- Status: active

Location
- Country: Myanmar
- Coordinates: 20.5167°N 96.8978°E

Architecture
- Established: 1840s

Nga Phe Chaung Monastery (Burmese: ငါးဖယ်ချောင်းကျောင်းတိုက်), also known as the "cat jumping monastery" (ကြောင်ခုန်ကျောင်း), is the oldest and largest wooden monastery on Inle Lake, Shan State, Myanmar. It is famous for its expansive timber architecture, a large varied collection of Buddha images, and the once-famous "jumping cat" spectacle. It is also one of the most visited cultural landmarks around Inle Lake.

== History ==
The monastery dates back to the mid-19th century, commonly cited as 1843 (Burmese year 1205 ME) or the late 1840s–1850s era, when local Shan rulers (the saopha/princes of Yawnghwe/Nyaung Shwe) supported construction of religious buildings on the lake.

Over the 19th and 20th centuries the monastery accumulated Buddha images and ritual items moved from older, smaller shrines and palaces in the surrounding Shan principalities. It grew into a local religious center later on.

From the 20th century into the early 2000s the monastery became popularly known as the "Jumping Cat Monastery" because the monks kept and trained cats to jump through hoops. The novelty drew many tourists and photographers. But later on, after the death or retirement of the abbot who oversaw the practice, the monastery leadership decided the cat-training performances were not appropriate for a monastic setting. The practice has largely been discontinued and the trained cats are no longer a regular public spectacle.

The monastery has suffered minor damages from recent floods and earthquakes.

== Monastery ==
The monastery is a traditionally stilt consisting of a multi-hall complex. It is supported by hundreds of teak pillars and raised wooden platforms to accommodate the seasonal water levels of Inle Lake. Its main Dhamma hall features a large, multi-tiered roof characteristic of Shan monastic architecture, with interiors showcasing the natural grain of aged teak, carved wooden pedestals and lacquer and gold-leaf decoration. The monastery also contains a varied collection of Buddha images. It has reflecting styles from Bagan, Ava (Inwa), and Tibetan traditions.

Phaung Daw Oo festival is usually held in this temple every year.

== Gallery ==
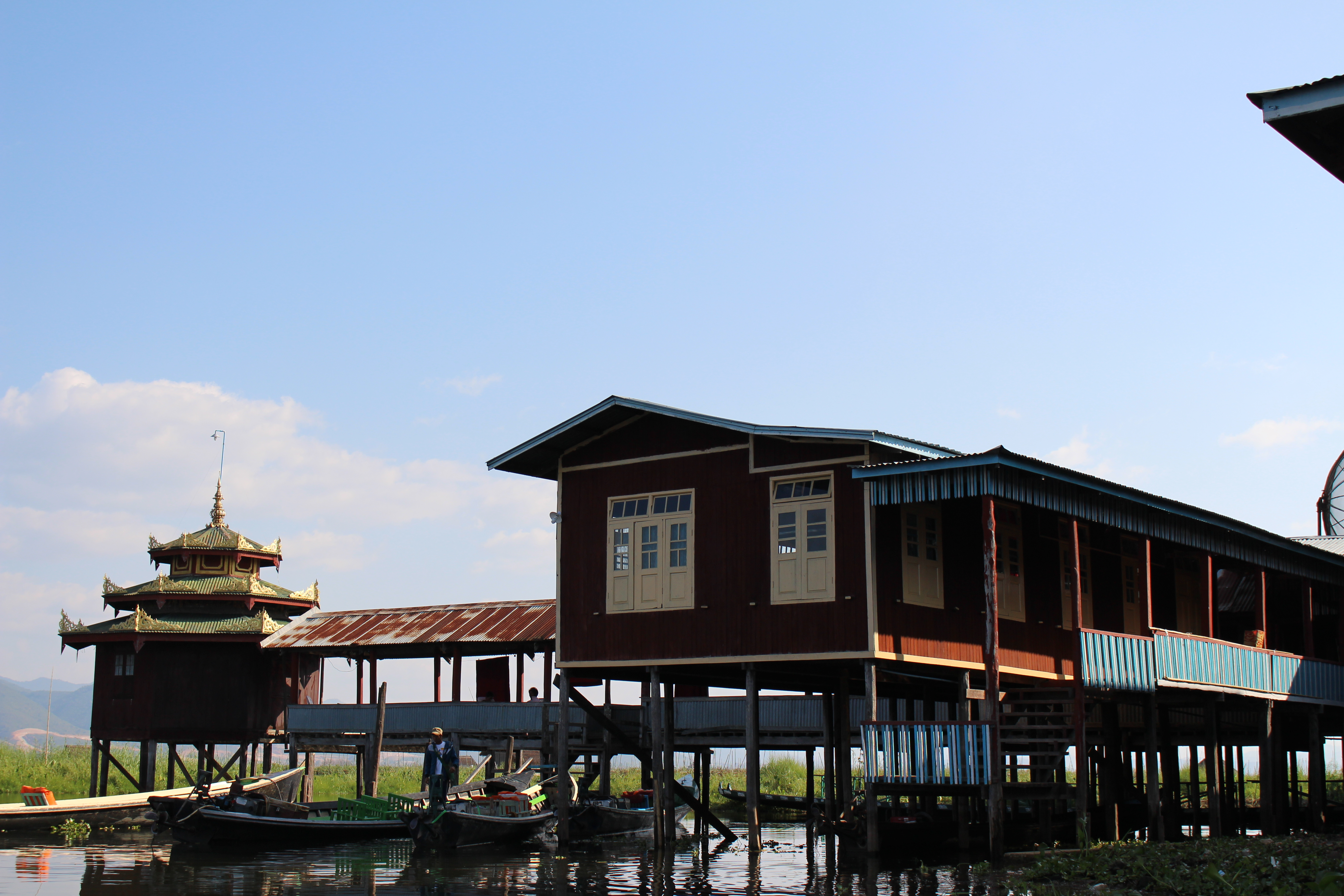

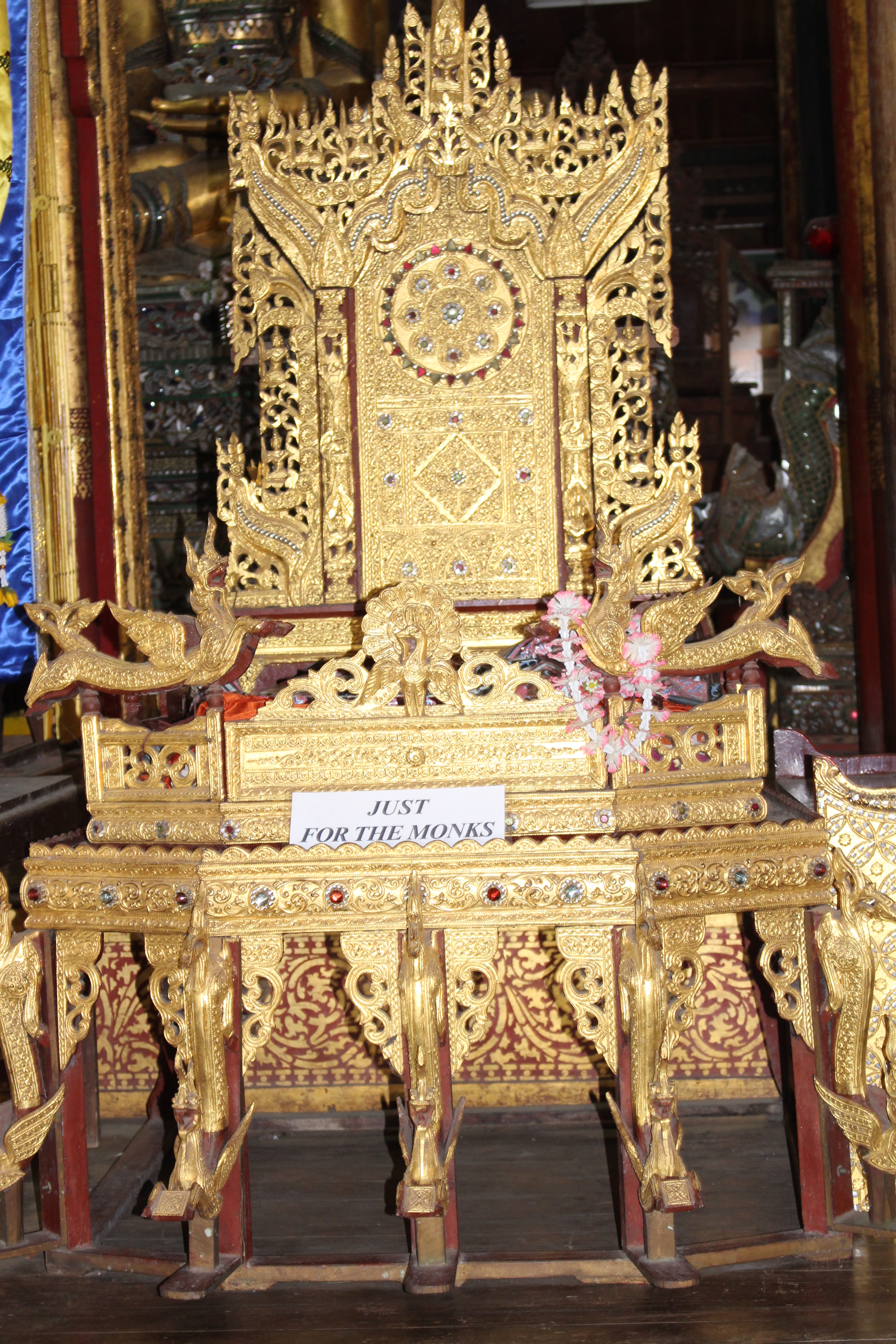

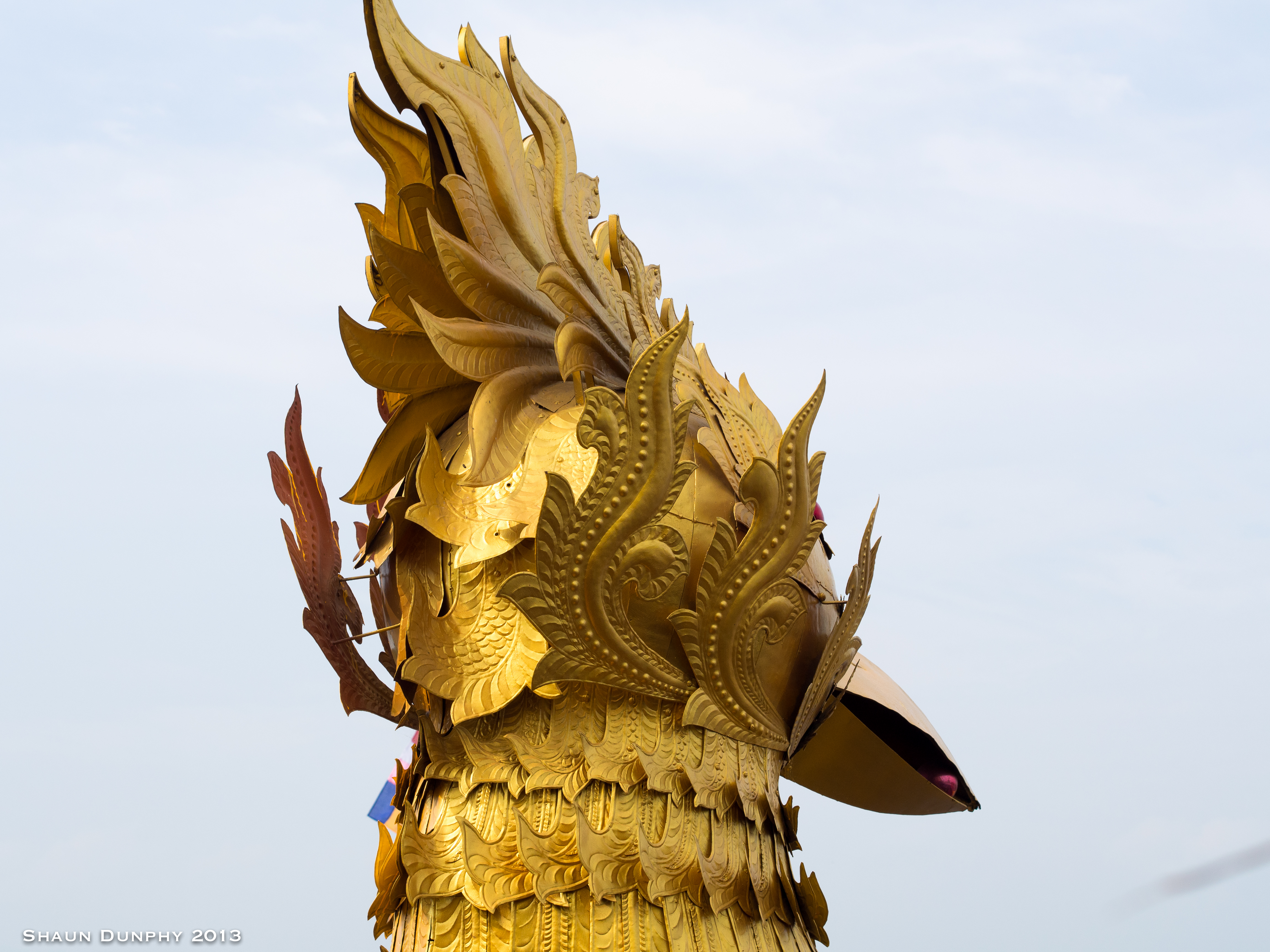

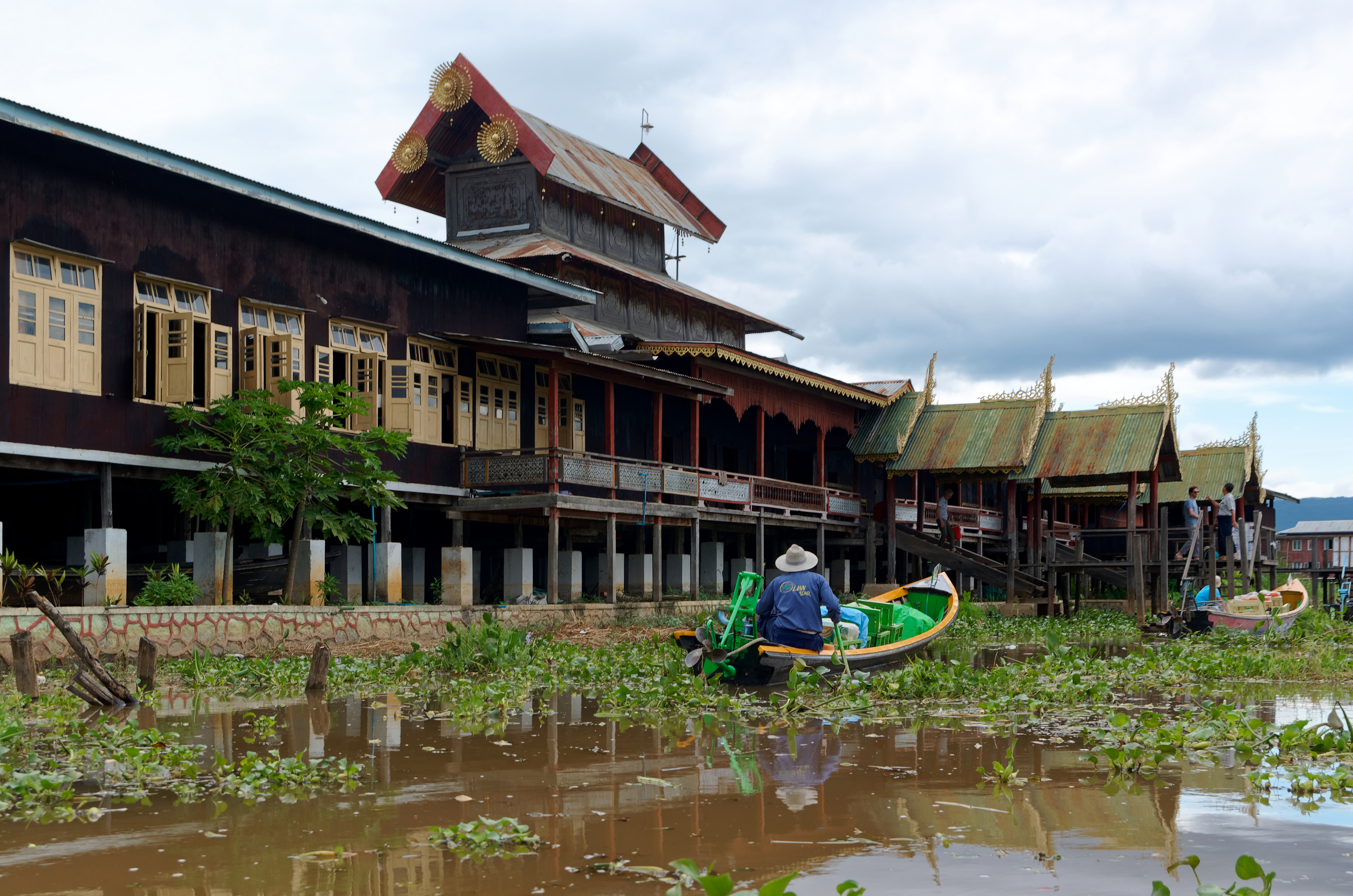

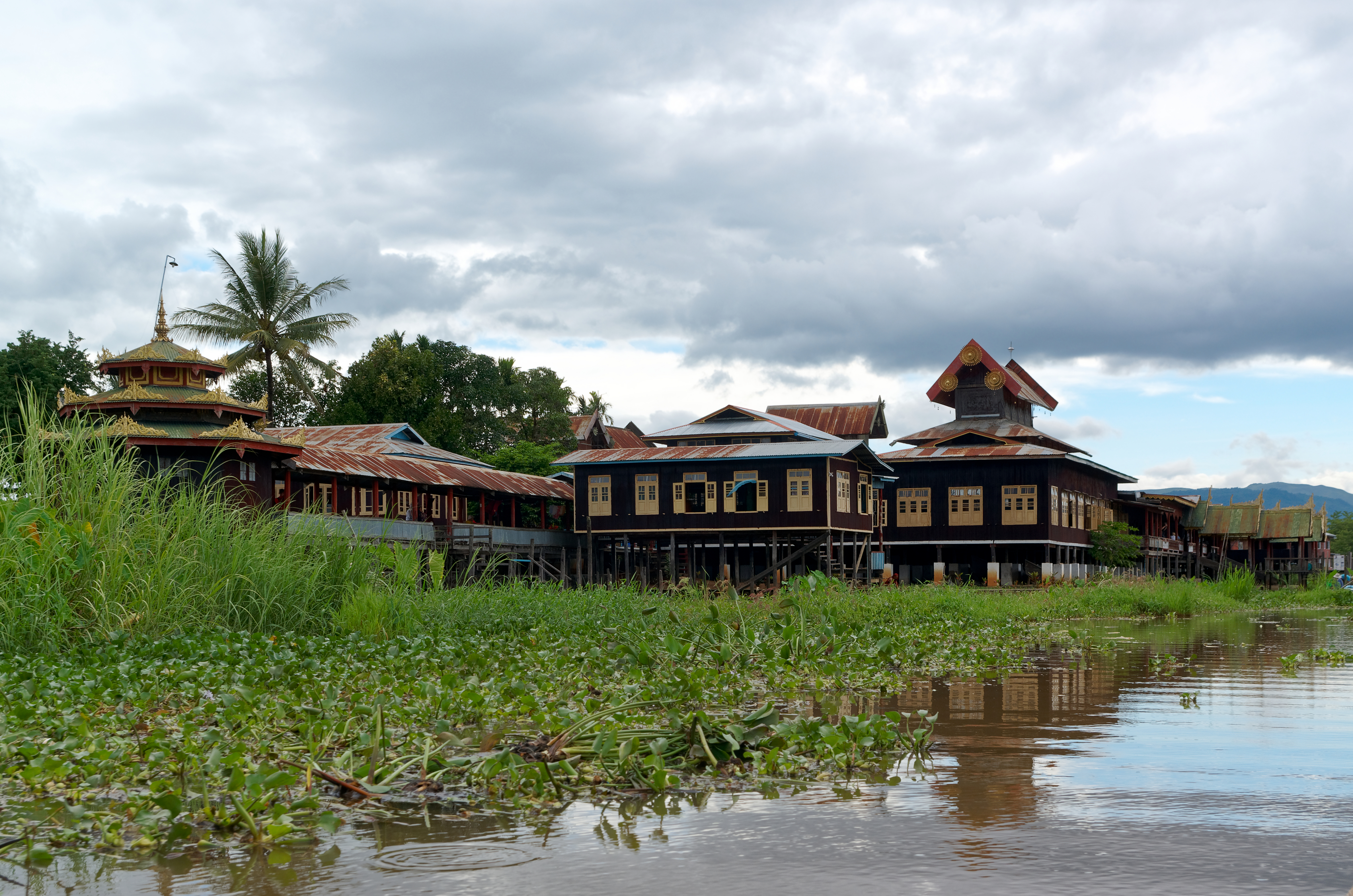

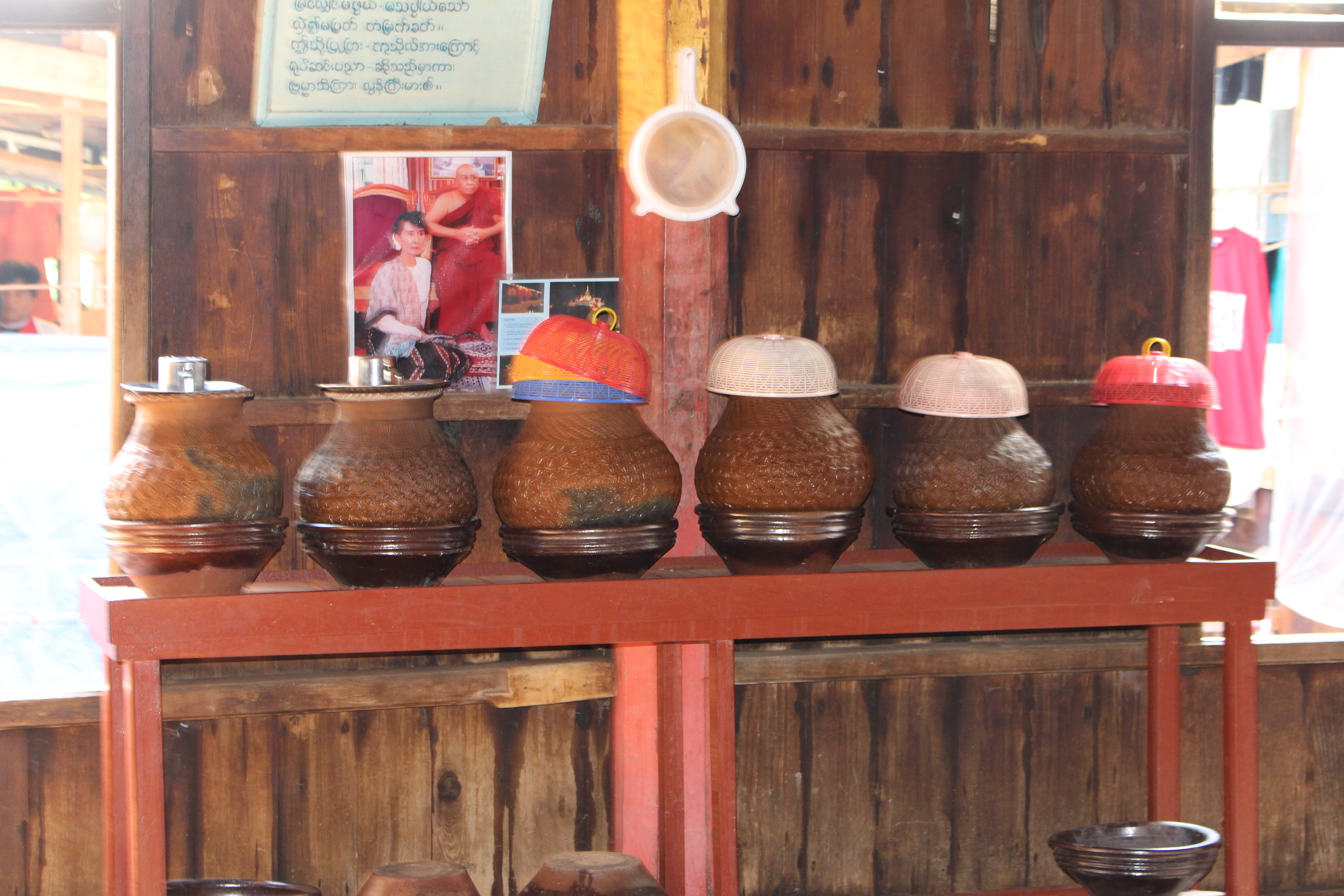

== See also ==
- Shwe Yan Pyay
- List of Buddhist temples in Myanmar
