= Lashio District =

Lashio လားရှိုးခရိုင်
- District
- Location in Shan State
- Coordinates: 22°55′00″N 97°44′00″E
- Country: Myanmar
- State: Shan State
- Capital: Lashio
- Elevation: 864 m (2,835 ft)
- Time zone: UTC+6.30 (MST)

Lashio District (Burmese: လားရှိုးခရိုင်) is a district of northern Shan State in Myanmar with three townships. Its capital is the north Shan State capital of Lashio.

== Townships ==
Townships of Lashio district Hseni Kunlong Lashio

The district contains three township:

- Lashio Township
- Hsenwi Township
- Kunlong Township (formerly part of Kunlong District)

In 2022, the Ministry of Home Affairs split off two townships (Tangyan Township and Mongyai Township) to form the new Tangyan District.

Prior to 2011, Lashio District also included the following townships, which became now part of Hopang District. Therefore, they are no longer part of Lashio District since September 2011.

- Mongmao Township
- Namphan Township also spelled as Naphan Township
- Pangsang Township also spelled as Panhkam Township
- Pangwaun Township also spelled as Panwai Township

It consisted of four towns and 2431 villages in 2001.
