= Kunlong District =

Kunlong
- District
- Location in Burma
- Coordinates: 23°25′20″N 98°39′10″E
- Country: Burma
- State: Shan State
- Elevation: 489 m (1,604 ft)
- Time zone: UTC+6.30 (MST)

Kunlong District was a district of the Shan State in Myanmar. It was dissolved in November 2014. It consists of 2 towns and 458 villages. The main road of the District, Hsenwi-Kunlong-Chinshwehaw road, is 66 miles (106 kilometres) long.

== Townships ==
The district contained the following townships:

- Kunlong Township
- Hopang Township

=== History ===
Hopang Township became part of Hopang District and is now not anymore under Kunlong District since September 2011. Now Kunlong Township corresponds into Lashio District.
