= Lashio Township =

Lashio Township (လားရှိုးမြို့နယ်)
- Township
- Location in Lashio district
- Coordinates: 22°56′0″N 97°44′0″E
- Country: Myanmar
- State: Shan State
- District: Lashio District
- Elevation: 2,861 ft (872 m)
- Time zone: UTC+6:30 (MMT)

Lashio Township (Burmese: လားရှိုးမြို့နယ်) is a township of Lashio District in the Shan State of eastern Burma. The principal town is Lashio located in Northern Shan State.

Lashio is famous by its natural resources. Its inhabitants belong to different ethnic groups such as Palaung, Wa, Chinese, Shan and Kachin people.
