= Kunlong Township =

Kunlong Township ကွမ်းလုံမြို့နယ်
- Township
- Location in Lashio district

- Location in Myanmar
- Coordinates: 23°25′20″N 98°39′10″E
- Country: Myanmar
- State: Shan State
- District: Lashio District

Area
  - Total: 379.39 sq mi (982.62 km^{2})
- Elevation: 1,413 ft (431 m)
- Highest elevation: 7,171 ft (2,186 m)

Population (2019)
  - Total: 56,304
  - Density: 148.41/sq mi (57.300/km^{2})
  - Ethnicities: Kokang; Wa; Bamar
  - Religions: "Other"; Buddhism; Christianity
- Time zone: UTC+6.30 (MST)

Kunlong Township is a township of Lashio District (formerly part of Kunlong District) in Shan State, Burma. The main town is Kunlong, located by the Salween River.

55% of the township identified as "Other religion" as of 2019 General Administration Department data, being noted as not Buddhist or Burmese folk religion.
