= Lashio University =

Liberal arts university

- လားရှိုးတက္ကသိုလ်
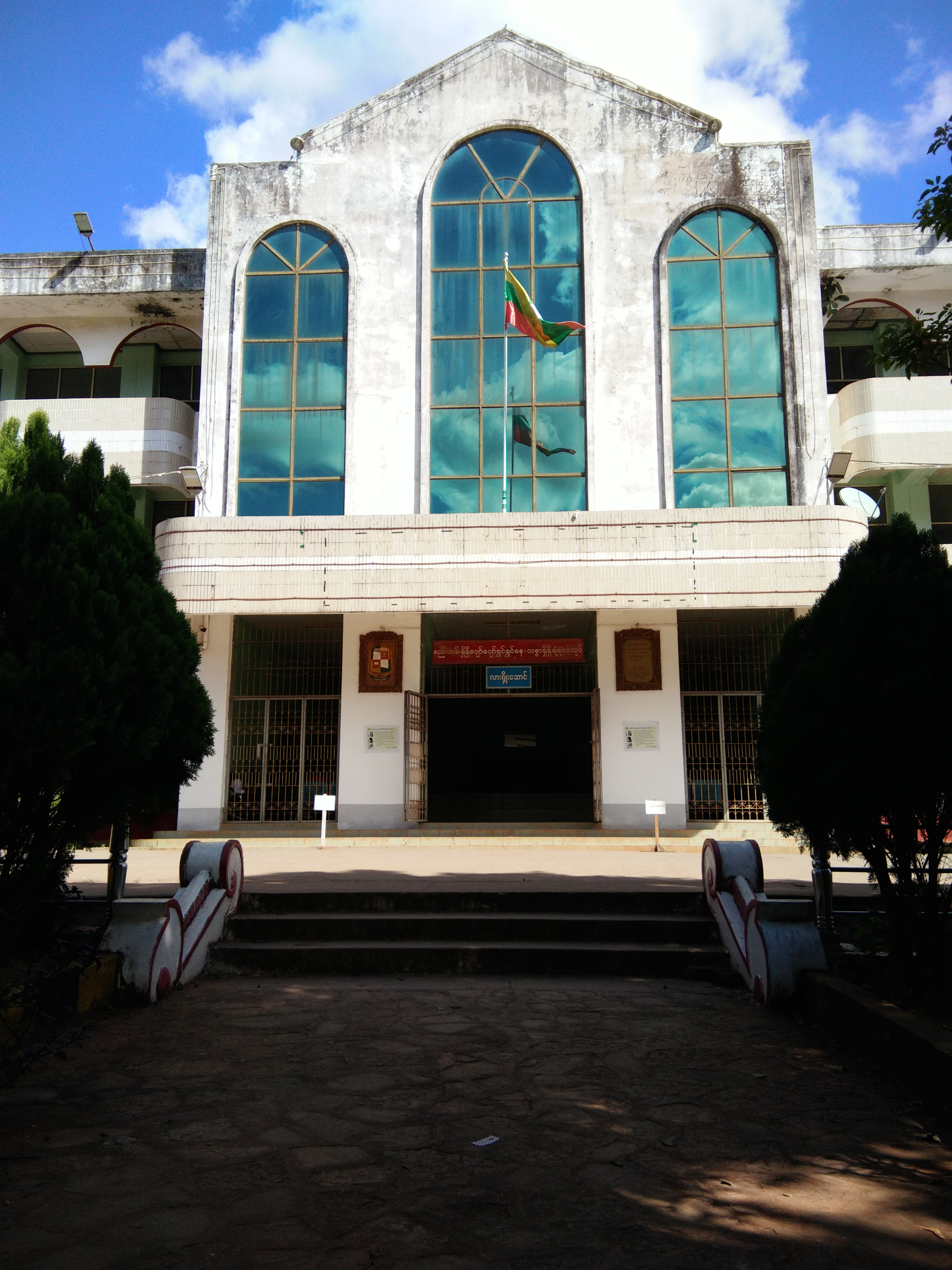
- Former names: Shan State Regional College (Lashio) (1978); Lashio College (1980); Lashio Degree College (1999)
- Motto: ပညာရဲရင့် အားမာန်ဝင့်
- Type: Public
- Established: 19 January 1978; 48 years ago
- Affiliations: Mandalay University
- Rector: Dr Kyaw Tun
- Location: Lashio, Myanmar; 22°57′19″N 97°44′19″E
- Campus: Urban
- Website: lashiouniversity.moe.edu.mm

Lashio University (Burmese: လားရှိုးတက္ကသိုလ်) is a public liberal arts university located in Lashio, Myanmar. Formerly an affiliate of Mandalay University, it offers bachelor's degree programs in common liberal arts, sciences and law disciplines.

== History ==
Lashio University was first established as Shan State Regional College (Lashio) on 19 January 1978 by the joint efforts of the state and local people. On 1 April 1980, it was transferred by the Ministry of Education and re-established, now affiliated with Mandalay University. On 7 July 1999, it was rebranded as the Lashio Degree College, until it became Lashio University on 20 January 2007.

In late 2023, due to instability arising from the ongoing Myanmar civil war, Lashio University ceased operations and educational authorities instructed students to transfer to other institutions in nearby communities. In July 2024, several Lashio University buildings were severely damaged during the Battle of Lashio.

Lashio University remained closed during the occupation of Lashio by the Myanmar National Democratic Alliance Army (MNDAA). In April 2025, Lashio University again returned to the control of the State Administration Council, Myanmar's military junta, after the retreat of the MNDAA from the city. Despite concerns about student safety and damage to Lashio University's campus, classes resumed at Lashio University in November 2025.

== Research Areas ==
A principal venue for Lashio University's published research outputs is the Lashio University Research Journal. A bibliometric analysis of the publications in this journal from 2009 through 2020 found that the most common subject of publications was physics. The full range of publication subjects is as follows:

Subject-wise distribution of articles (2009–2020)
Subject	Number of articles	Percentage
Physics	22	11.64
Myanmar	19	10.05
Botany	18	9.52
Geography	18	9.52
Zoology	18	9.52
Mathematics	17	8.99
Chemistry	16	8.46
History	16	8.46
English	15	7.94
Geology	14	7.41
Philosophy	11	5.82
Oriental Studies	5	2.64
Total	189	100

The same analysis found that 92% of research articles were written in English only or in both Myanmar and English, and that 75% of authors were female.

== Departments ==
- Burmese
- English
- Geography
- History
- Philosophy
- Oriental Studies
- Chemistry
- Physics
- Mathematics
- Zoology
- Botany
- Geology

== Administration ==
The current head of the university is Dr Kyaw Tun, the rector.

=== Regional College ===
- Saw Aung (Headmaster) (19.1.1978 to 31.3.1980)

=== College ===
- Saw Aung (Headmaster) (1.4.1980 to 7.2.1982)
- Dr Hla Myint (Headmaster) (8.2.1982 to 14.5.1992)
- Htay Aung (Headmaster) (15.5.1992 to 24.8.1992)

Saw Aung (Headmaster) (25.8.1992 to 22.7.1997)

=== Degree College ===
- Myo Tint Swe (Headmaster) (23.7.1997 to 8.1.2002)
- Thar Oo (Headmaster) (8.1.2002 to 31.10.2002)
- Phay Thaung (Headmaster) (1.11.2002 to 19.1.2007)

=== University ===
- Phay Thaung (Pro Rector) (20.1.2007 to 31.3.2007)
- Dr Khin Maung Oo (Pro Rector) (1.4.2007 to 27.1.2009)
- Dr Htay Aung Win(Pro Rector) (27.1.2009 to 7.2.2011)
- Dr Thein Win (Acting Pro Rector) (8.2.2011 to 15.2.2011)
- Dr Maung Maung (Pro Rector) (16.2.2011 to 31.7.2014)
- Dr Maung Maung (Rector) (1.8.2014 to 10.11.2015)
- Dr Tun Hlaing (Pro Rector) (11.11.2015 to 18.3.2016)
- Dr Maung Maung Naing (Rector) (19.3.2016 to 3.11.2016)
- Dr Yaw Han Tun (Pro Rector) (11.11.2017 to 3.12.2017)
- Dr Kyaw Tun (Rector) (4.12.2017 - )
