= Mong Hpyak =

Monghpyak ဝဵင်းမိူင်းၽျႅၢၵ်ႈ မိုင်းဖြတ်မြို့
- Town
- Mong Phyet
- Location in Myanmar
- Coordinates: 20°52′35″N 99°55′23″E
- Country: Myanmar
- State: Shan State
- District: Tachileik
- Township: Mong Hpyak

Population
  - Religions: Buddhism
- Time zone: UTC+6.30 (MMT)
- WOEID: 1017631

Monghpyak (Burmese: မိုင်းဖြတ်မြို့; also spelt Maingbyat, Meng-pen-ma; Mong is equivalent to Mueang) is a town in Kengtung District (formerly part of Mong Hpayak District) of eastern Shan State of Myanmar. It is the principal town of and administrative center for Mong Hpyak Township. The town is located on the Tachilek–Kengtung paved road. As of 2005, a paved road was under construction from Mong Hpyak east to Mong Yawng.
