= Möng Kō =

Mong Ko
- Village
- Location within Myanmar
- Coordinates: 20°34′3″N 99°58′37″E
- Country: Burma
- State: Shan State
- District: Tachileik District
- Township: Tachileik Township
- Elevation: 1,480 ft (450 m)
- Time zone: UTC+6:30 (MMT)

'Möng Kō, also known as Mong Kois a village in Tachileik Township, Tachileik District, Shan State. It lies near the National Highway 4 (Burma).
