= Mong Yawng District =

Mong Yawng Township Mong Yawng District ၸႄႈဝဵင်းမိူင်းယွင်း, မိုင်းယောင်းမြို့နယ် ၸႄႈတွၼ်ႈမိူင်းယွင်း, မိုင်းယောင်းခရိုင်
- Township and District
- Location in Shan State
- Coordinates: 21°11′0″N 100°22′0″E
- Country: Myanmar
- State: Shan State
- District: Mong Yawng District
- Capital: Mong Yawng

Population
  - Ethnicities: Shan
  - Religions: Theravada Buddhism
- Time zone: UTC+6.30 (MST)

Mong Yawng Township (Shan: ၸႄႈဝဵင်းမိူင်းယွင်း, Burmese: မိုင်းယောင်းမြို့နယ်) is the only township of Mong Yawng District (Shan: ၸႄႈတွၼ်ႈမိူင်းယွင်း, Burmese: မိုင်းယောင်းခရိုင်) in eastern Shan State. It is the easternmost township of Myanmar. The principal town is Mong Yawng.

== History ==
Möng Yawng was historically one of the Shan States, largely inhabited by the Wa people. It was annexed by Kengtung State in 1815. The capital was the town of Mong Yawng.

Prior to 2011, it was part of the Mong Hpayak District. In 2022, Mong Yawng Township was promoted to its own district by the Ministry of Home Affairs splitting off from Tachileik District.

Today, the district only has one township - Mong Yawng Township and its informal subdivision the Mong Yu Subtownship. The township is mostly part under Eastern Shan State Special Region 4 administration, especially the Mong Yu Subtownship, where it is known as Nanban District.
