= Loi Pangnao =

- Location within Myanmar

Highest point
- Elevation: 2,563 m (8,409 ft)
- Prominence: 1,590 m (5,220 ft)
- Listing: List of Ultras of Southeast Asia; Ribu
- Coordinates: 21°19′1″N 100°19′57″E

Geography
- Location: Shan State, Myanmar
- Parent range: Daen Lao Range

Climbing
- First ascent: unknown
- Easiest route: climb

Loi Pangnao is the highest mountain of the Daen Lao Range (Loi La Range), a subrange of the Shan Hills. It is located near Mong Yawng in Shan State, Burma close to the border with China.

With a height of 2,563 m and a prominence of 1,590 m, Loi Pangnao is one of the ultra prominent peaks of Southeast Asia.

== See also ==
- List of ultras of Southeast Asia
- List of mountains in Burma
