= Mae Surin Falls =

Coordinates: 18°55′09″N 98°03′08″E

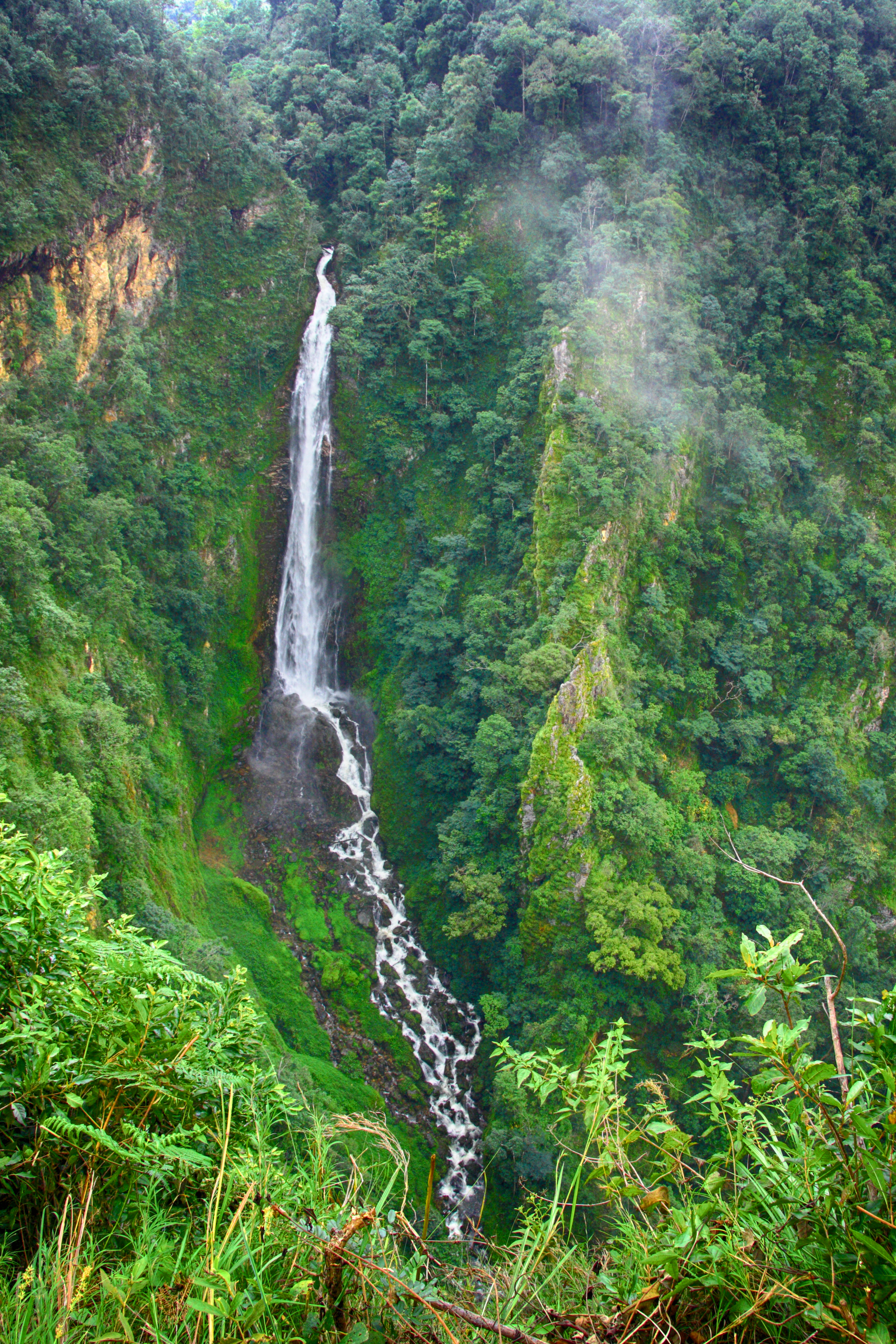
- Mae Surin Waterfalls
- Interactive map of Mae Surin Falls
- Location: Mae Hong Son Province, Thailand

Nam Tok Mae Surin, also known as Mae Surin Falls, are waterfalls in Thailand's Mae Hong Son Province.

Mae Surin Waterfall is 100 meters in height. The surrounding forest still maintains its natural abundance.

Namtok Mae Surin National Park includes some of the highest peaks of the Thanon Thong Chai Range with elevations between 300 and 1,700 metres above sea level. These mountains are the source of numerous streams and small rivers which are important for the Pai River.

== See also ==
- List of waterfalls
