= Daen Lao Range =

Mountain chain in Burma and Thailand

- ทิวเขาแดนลาว / Loi La
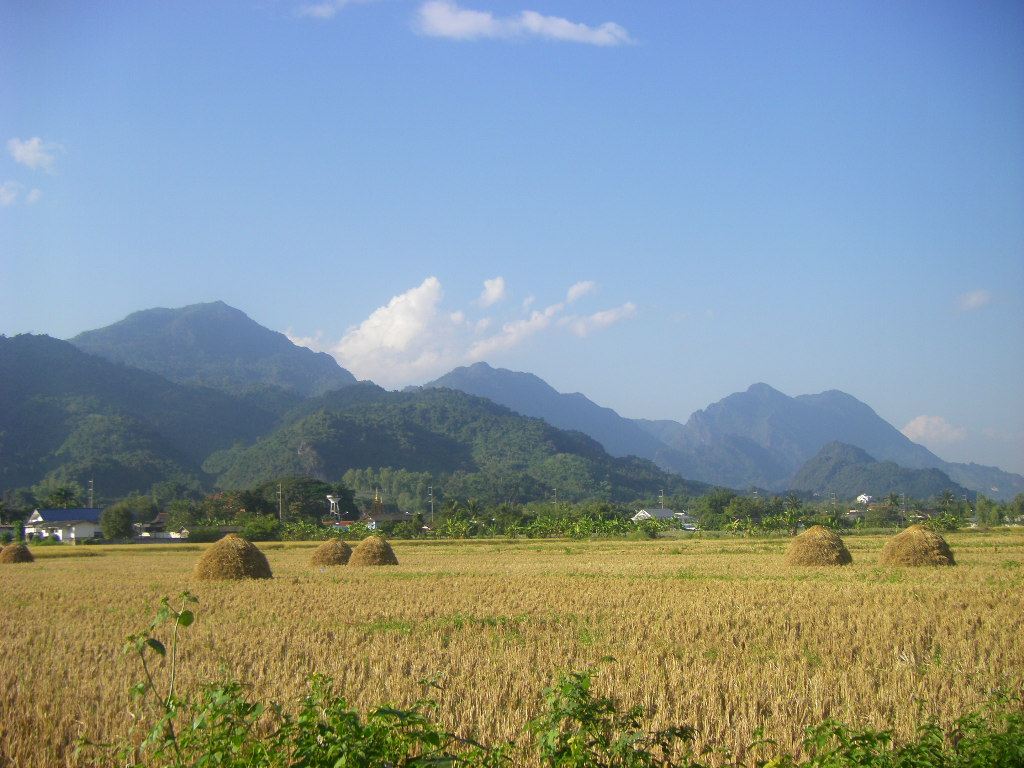
- Doi Nang Non, the "Mountain of the Sleeping Lady"

Highest point
- Peak: Loi Pangnao
- Elevation: 2,563 m (8,409 ft)
- Coordinates: 28°18′N 100°20′E

Dimensions
- Length: 355 km (221 mi) NE/SW
- Width: 50 km (31 mi) NW/SE

Geography
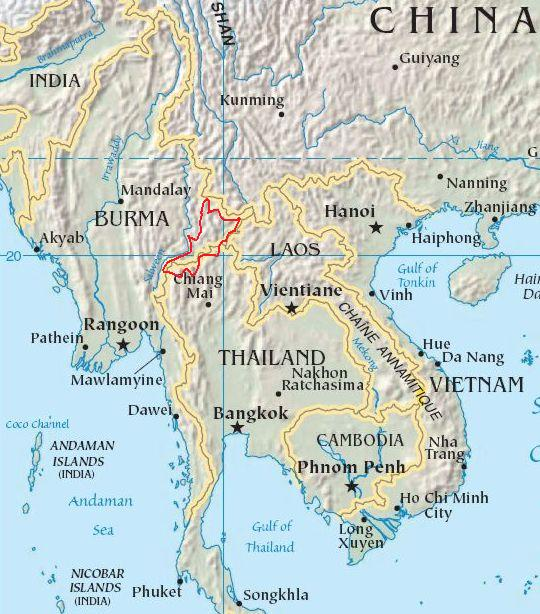
- Location of the Daen Lao Range
- Countries: Burma and Thailand
- Parent range: Shan Hills

Geology
- Rock type(s): granite and limestone

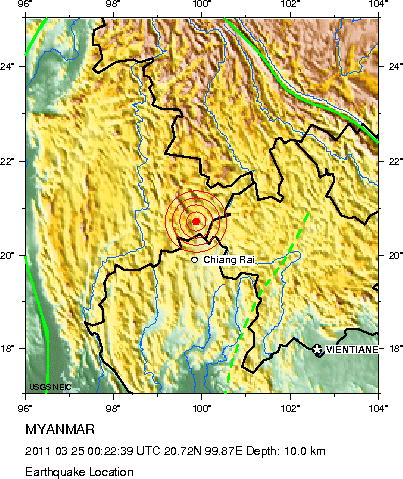
2011 Burma March 25 earthquake location

The Daen Lao Range (Thai: ทิวเขาแดนลาว, pronounced [tʰīw kʰǎw dɛ̄ːn lāːw]; Burmese: Loi La) is a mountain range of the Shan Hills in eastern Burma and northern Thailand. Most of the range is in Shan State, with its northern limit close to the border with China, and runs southwards across the Thai border, at the northern end of Thailand.

Geologically in the Daen Lao Range, as in the other southern subranges of the Shan Hills, layers of alluvium are superimposed on hard rock.

== Geography ==
The range extends east of the Salween until almost reaching the Golden Triangle area, separating the Salween watershed from the Mekong watershed. At its southern end the Thanon Thong Chai Range (เทือกเขาถนนธงชัย) subrange stretches further southwards into Thailand between the Sai River in the east and the Pai River in the west; the latter separating the Daen Lao from the Thanon Thong Chai Range. Some geographers include the Thanon Thong Chai Range subrange as part of the Daen Lao Range. The Khun Tan Range also extends southwards from the Daen Lao Range, parallel to the Thanon Thong Chai mountains, but it differs geologically and structurally from the latter.

The western end of the range is not clearly defined. Elevations range between 400 and 2,500 m. The highest point is 2,563 m Loi Pangnao in Burma, with a prominence of 1,596 m, one of the ultra prominent peaks of Southeast Asia. On the Thai side the highest point is 2,285 m Doi Pha Hom Pok. Doi Chiang Dao (2,175 m), Doi Puk Phakka (1,794 m), Doi Nang Non, a karstic formation in Chiang Rai Province, Doi Tung, Doi Ang Khang and Doi Wao, where Wat Phra That Doi Wao is located, as well as the mountains surrounding the village of Santikhiri (Doi Mae Salong) are also part of this range.

== History ==
Historically the area has been sparsely populated. Only some hill tribes such as the Wa, Akha, Yao, Lahu, and the Lisu people lived in scattered small villages across the range.

Many Shan people believe King Naresuan was cremated in the Daen Lao Range, in the southern part of Shan State, and his ashes interred in a stupa in Mongton.

Until the 1990s one of the main crops at elevations above 1,000 m was opium. On the side of the range controlled by the Thai government, construction of roads reaching remote areas and increasingly efficient policing ensured a measure of success of the opium replacement programs in recent years.

Owing to the unrest in Burma, the National Democratic Alliance Army (NDAA) and other groups sought refuge and a base for their insurgency in these mountains. Fighting and the ensuing persecution by the Tatmadaw have caused part of the original population to flee. Some refugee camps have been established for cross-border refugees on the Thai side of the range. Some Kayah and Karen communities, like the "long-necked Karen", are regularly visited by organized tourist groups.

The Ang Khang Royal Agricultural Station is in the mountains of the range. It was founded in 1969 by the King of Thailand and is notable for its temperate climate that allows the cultivation of flowers and fruits characteristic of cooler climates.

In March 2011 there was a magnitude 5 earthquake in the Burmese side of the range with the epicenter north of Chiang Rai town. There were over 70 deaths and more than hundred wounded.

== Protected areas ==
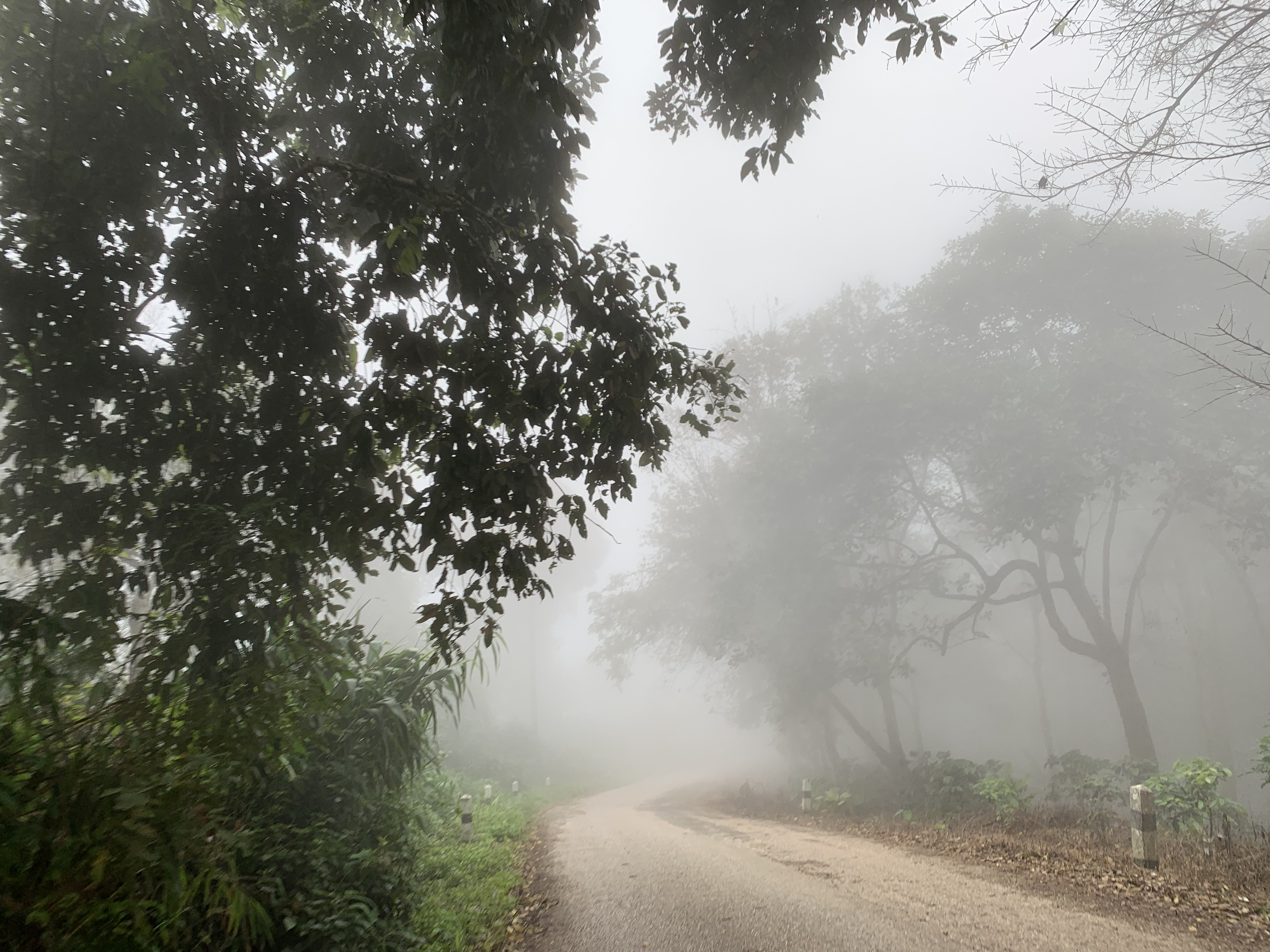
A road through Doi Chang Mup along Myanmar–Thailand border of Daen Lao in Chiang Rai Province

=== Burma ===
- Loimwe National Park
- Pasa Wildlife Reserve

=== Thailand ===
- Lam Nam Kok National Park
- Chiang Dao Wildlife Sanctuary
- Doi Pha Hom Pok National Park
- Huai Nam Dang National Park
- Pha Daeng National Park
- Tham Pla–Namtok Pha Suea National Park

== Features ==
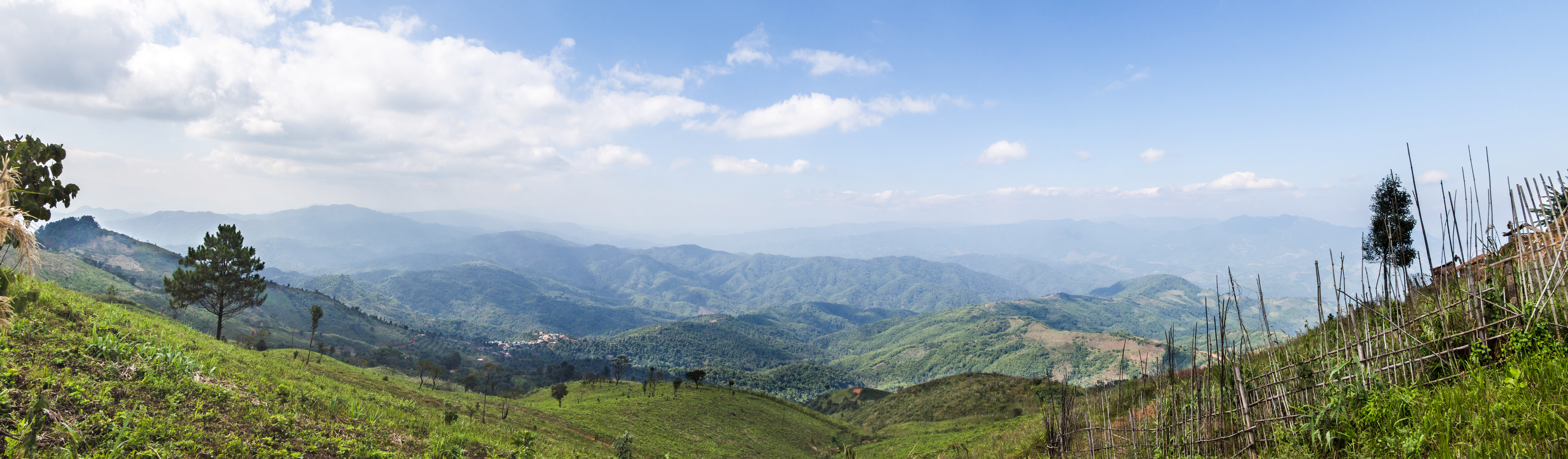
Looking out over Burma from Thailand, into the heart of the range

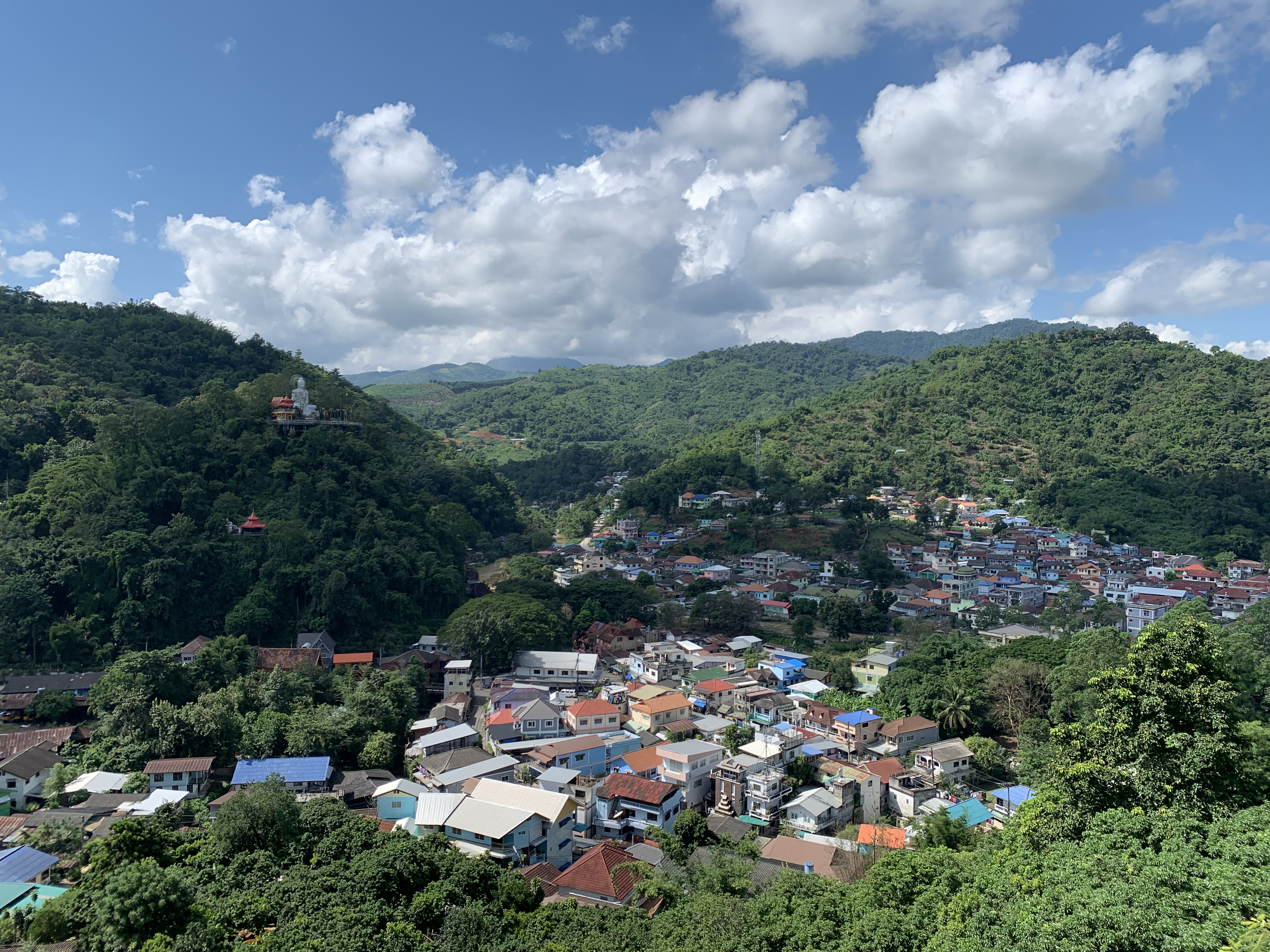
Wat Phra That Doi Wao and the Daen Lao Range, Thai highlands

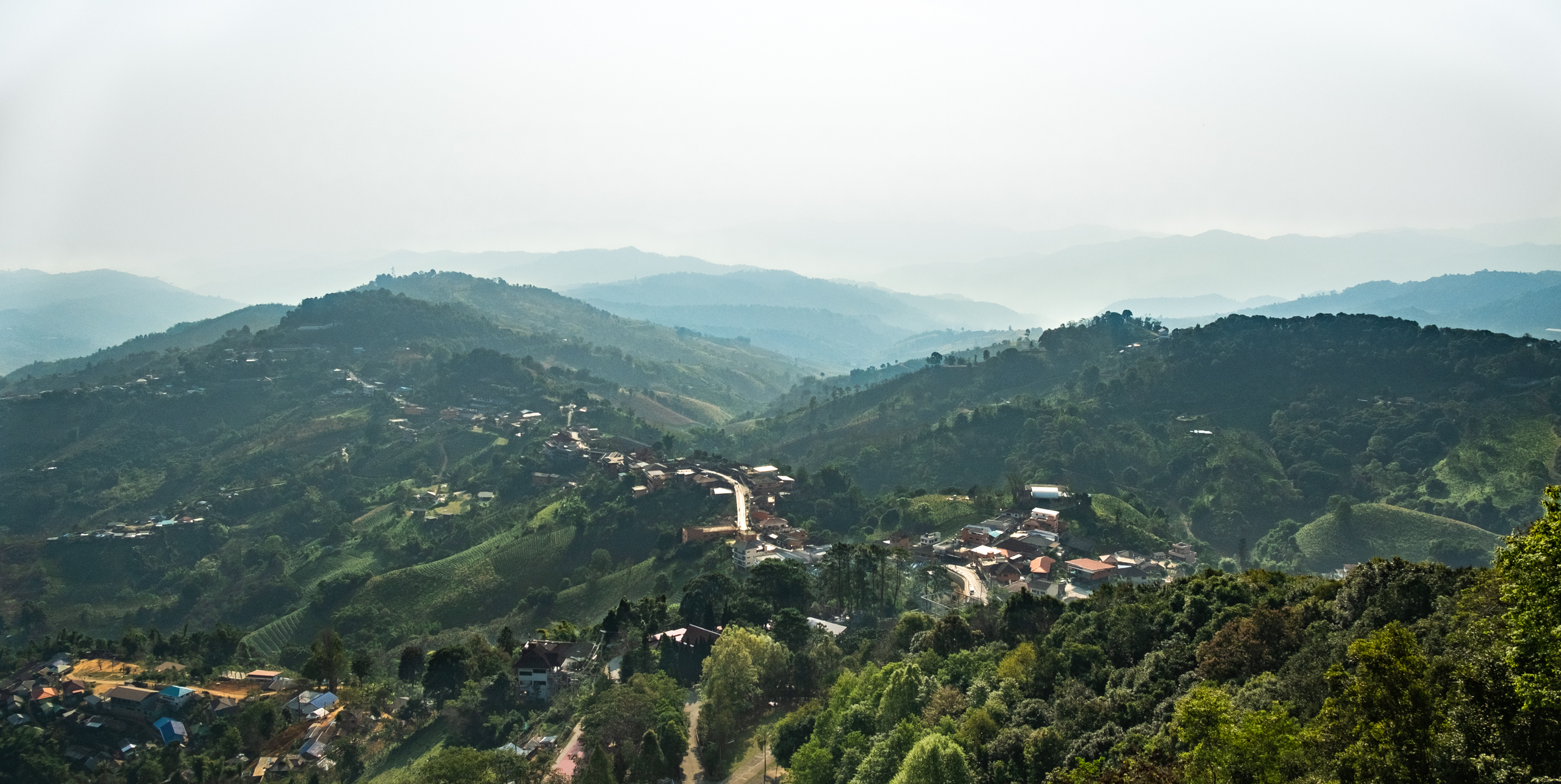
The eastern end of the town of Santikhiri at Doi Mae Salong

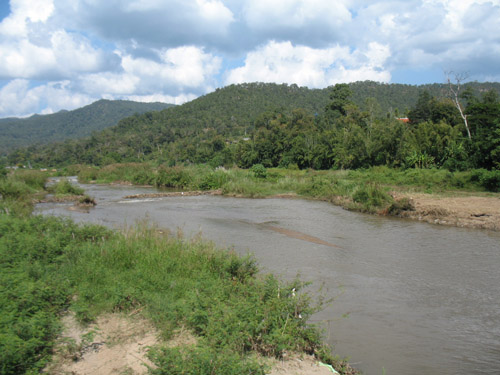
The range above the Pai River in Pai District. This river has its source in the SW of the range

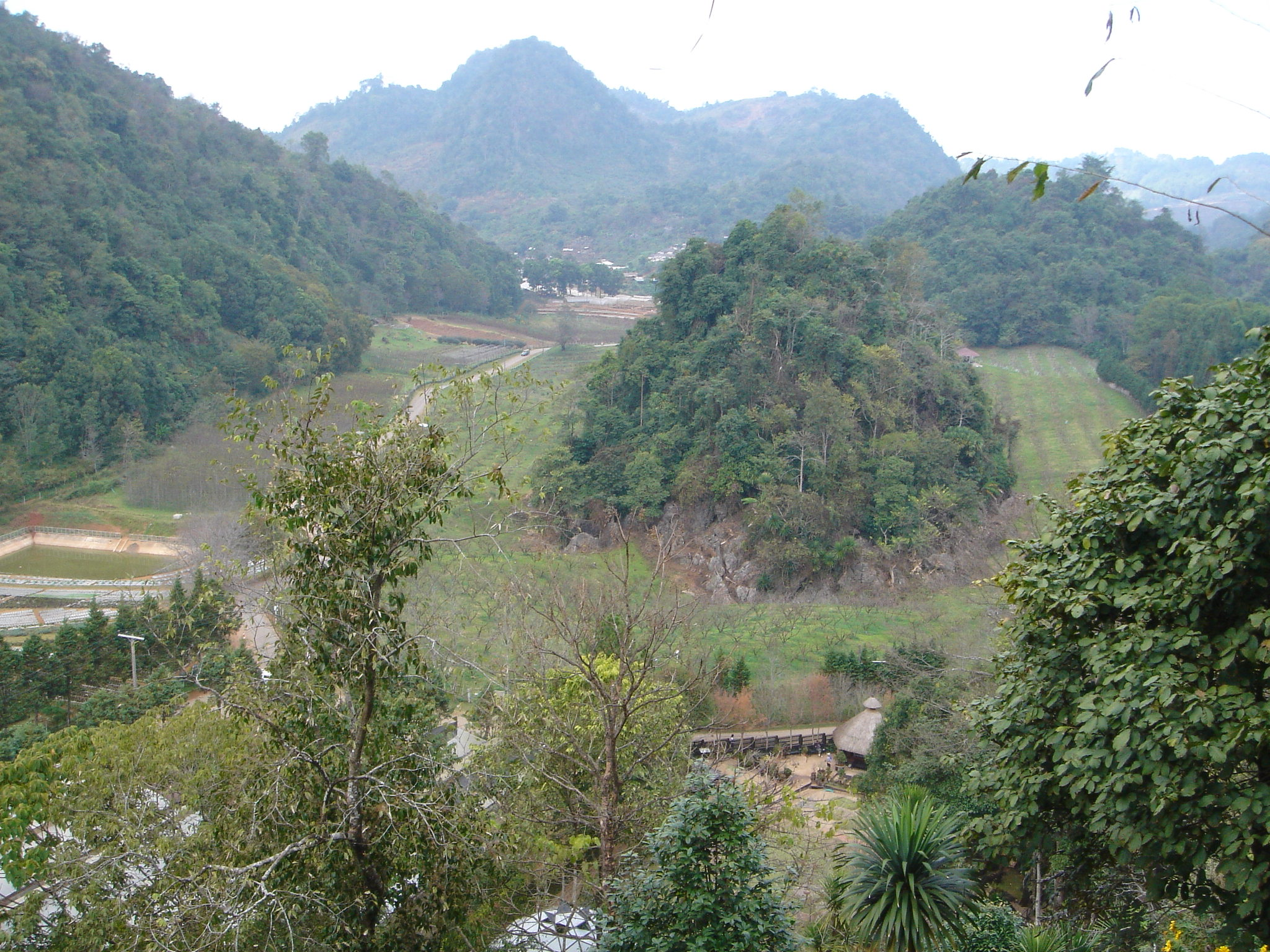
Ang Khang Royal Agricultural Station

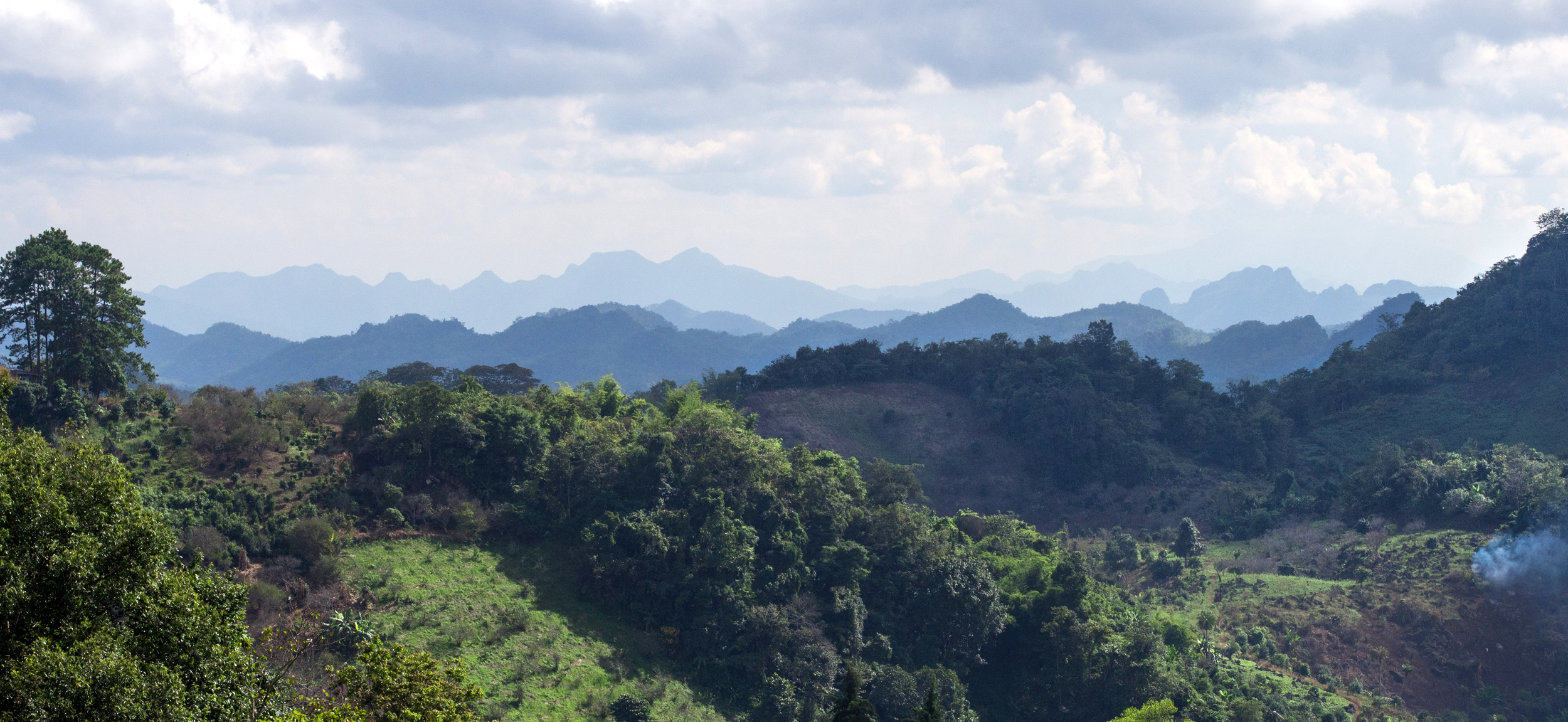
View from Rte 1340 in Chai Prakan District

== See also ==
- Doi Nang Non, the "Sleeping Lady"
- Western Forest Complex
- Thai highlands
- List of Ultras of Southeast Asia
- Doi Pha Hom Pok National Park
- Tham Pla–Namtok Pha Suea National Park
