= Mong Hpyak Township =

Mong Phyet Township ၸႄႈဝဵင်းမိူင်းၽျၢၵ်ႈ မိုင်းဖြတ်မြို့နယ်)
- Township
- Location in Tachileik district (red)
- Coordinates: 20°52′43″N 99°55′32″E
- Country: Burma
- Region: Shan State
- District: Tachileik District

Population
  - Ethnicities: Shan
  - Religions: Theravada Buddhism
- Time zone: UTC+6.30 (MMT)

Monghpyak Township (Shan: ၸႄႈဝဵင်းမိူင်းၽျၢၵ်ႈ), officially Mong Phyet (Burmese: မိုင်းဖြတ်မြို့နယ်), is a township of Tachileik District in the Eastern Shan State of Myanmar. It was formerly part of Mong Hpayak District. The principal town is Monghpyak.
