= Loi Leng =

Mountain in Myanmar

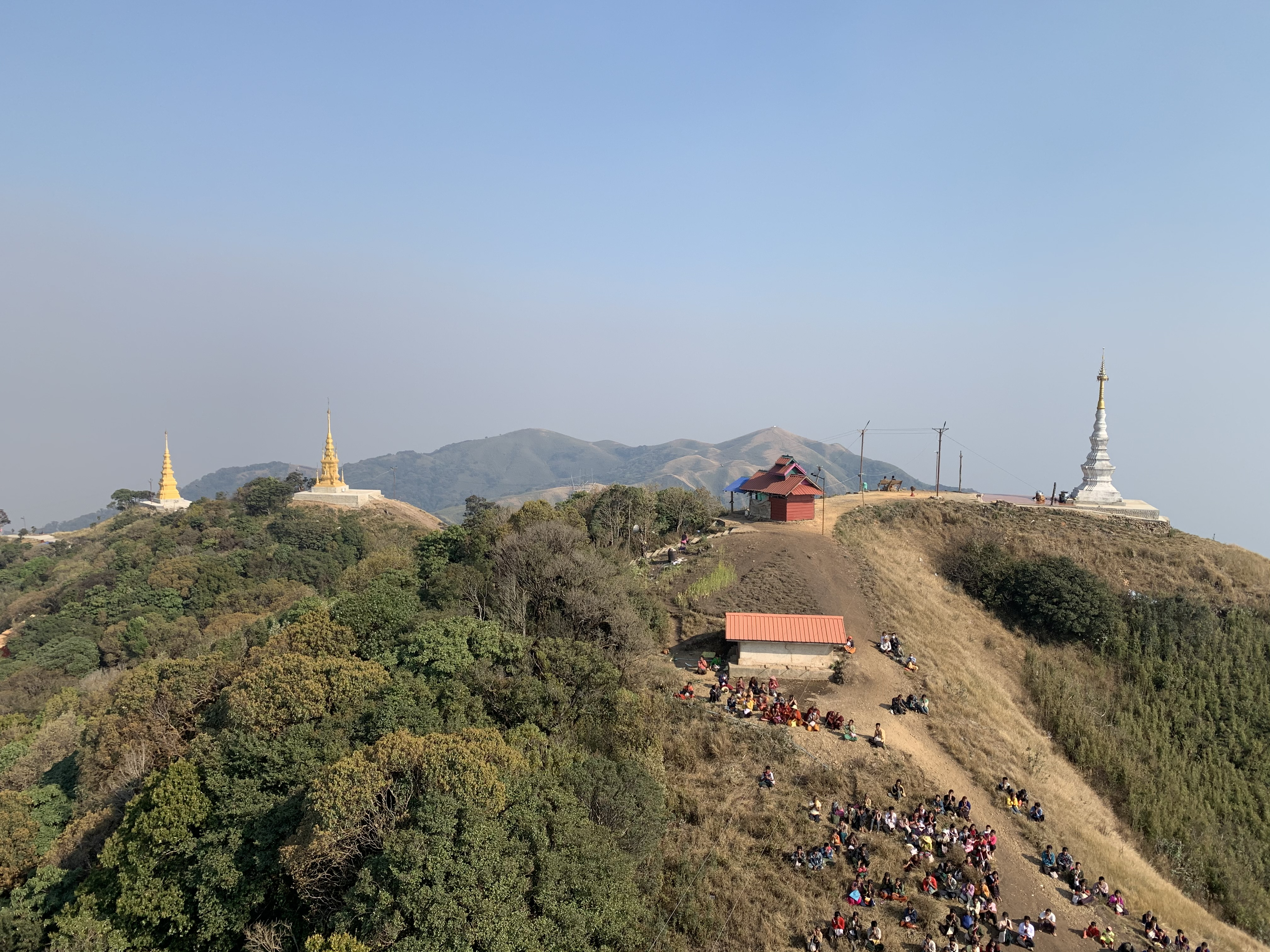

Highest point
- Elevation: 2,673 m (8,770 ft)
- Prominence: 1,823 m (5,981 ft)
- Listing: List of Ultras of Southeast Asia; Ribu
- Coordinates: 22°38′34″N 98°4′24″E

Geography
- Location within Myanmar
- Location: Shan State, Myanmar
- Parent range: Shan Hills

Climbing
- First ascent: unknown
- Easiest route: climb

Loi Leng is the highest mountain of the Shan Hills. It is located in Shan State, Burma, 45 kilometres (28 mi) to the southeast of Lashio.

== Geography ==
Loi Leng is part of a massif with multiple peaks located 6 kilometres (3.7 mi) to the SW Pa-kawlam, 10 km to the north of Mong Pat and 11 kilometres (6.8 mi) to the east of Kawngwit villages.

With a height of 2,673 metres (8,770 ft) and a prominence of 1,823 metres (5,981 ft), Loi Leng, the highest peak of the massif, is one of the ultra prominent peaks of Southeast Asia.

== See also ==
- List of mountains in Burma
- List of ultras of Southeast Asia
