= Parsar Protected Area =

Parsar, in Myanmar, size and elevation

- IUCN category IV (habitat/species management area)
- Location within Myanmar
- Location: Tachileik District, Myanmar
- Nearest city: Tachileik Township
- Coordinates: 20°31′N 100°00′E
- Area: 76.53 km^{2} (29.55 sq mi)
- Established: 1996

Parsar Protected Area is a protected area in Myanmar, covering 76.53 km^{2} (29.55 sq mi). It ranges in elevation from 370 to 1,105 m (1,214 to 3,625 ft) in the eastern part of Shan State, close to the international border with Laos and Thailand.
