= Mong Yawng Yazawin =

- Original title: မိုင်းယောင်း ရာဇဝင်
- Language: Shan
- Series: Shan chronicles
- Genre: Chronicle, History
- Publication date: 19th century
- Publication place: Mong Yawng, Kingdom of Burma

Mong Yawng Yazawin (Burmese: မိုင်းယောင်း ရာဇဝင်, lit. 'Chronicle of Mong Yawng') is a 19th-century Burmese chronicle that covers the history of the Shan state of Mong Yawng. It is believed to have been written after the publication of Hmannan Yazawin.

== Bibliography ==
- Cochrane, W.W. (1915). The Shans. Vol. 1. Yangon: Superintendent, Government Printing.
