= Loimwe Protected Area =

Protected area in Myanmar

- IUCN category IV (habitat/species management area)
- Location within Myanmar
- Location: Shan Hills, Myanmar
- Coordinates: 21°12′N 99°46′E
- Area: 41.35 km^{2} (15.97 sq mi)
- Established: 1996
- Governing body: Forest Department of Kengtung Township

Loimwe Protected Area is a protected area in Myanmar's Shan State, covering 41.35 km^{2} (15.97 sq mi). It ranges in elevation from 925 to 1,920 m (3,035 to 6,299 ft) and harbours dry hill forest interspersed with pine trees. It was established in 1996 and is managed by the Forest Department of Kengtung Township.
