= Shan Hills =

Mountainous zone in Yunnan, Myanmar and Thailand

- ရှမ်းရိုးမ
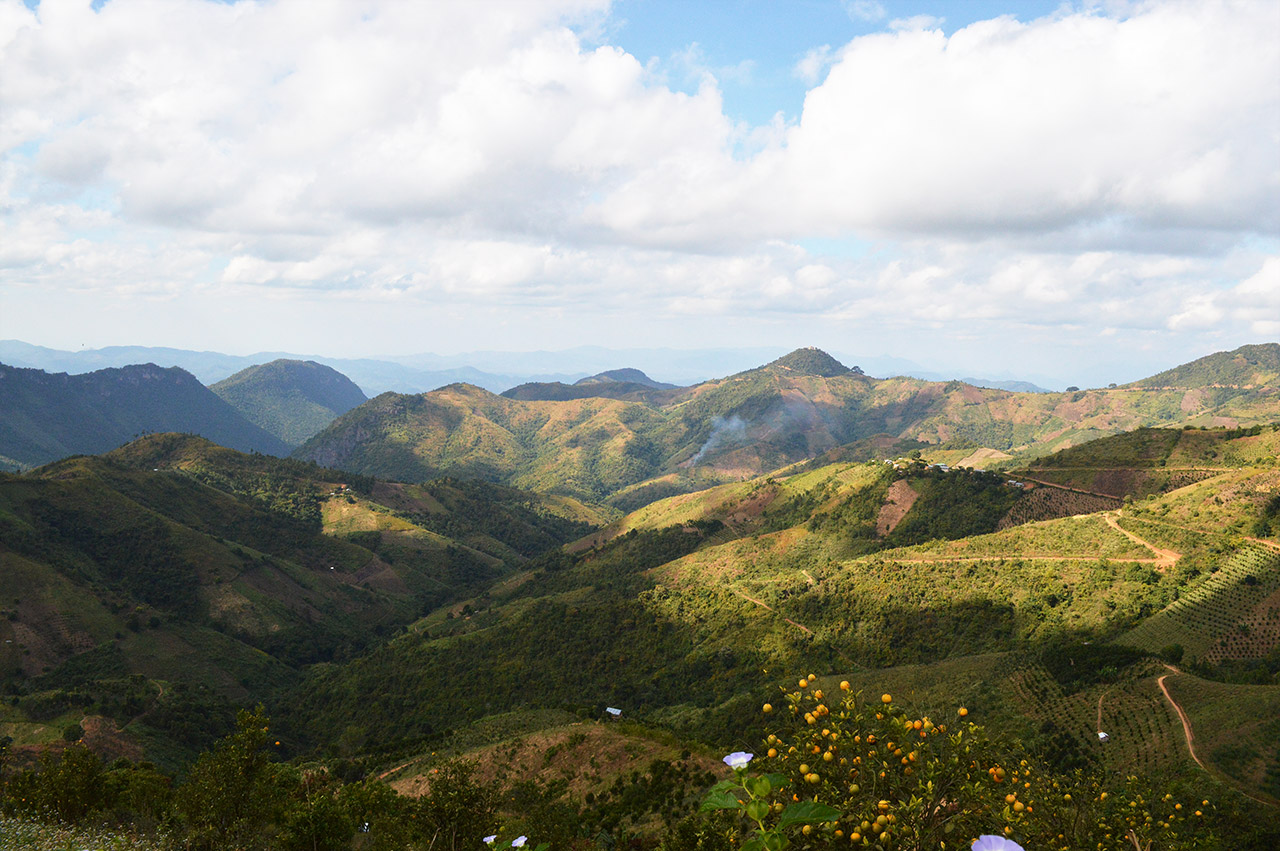
- View of the Shan Hills in southern Shan State

Highest point
- Peak: Loi Leng
- Elevation: 2,673 m (8,770 ft)
- Coordinates: 22°39′N 98°4′E

Dimensions
- Length: 560 km (350 mi) N/S
- Width: 330 km (210 mi) E/W

Geography
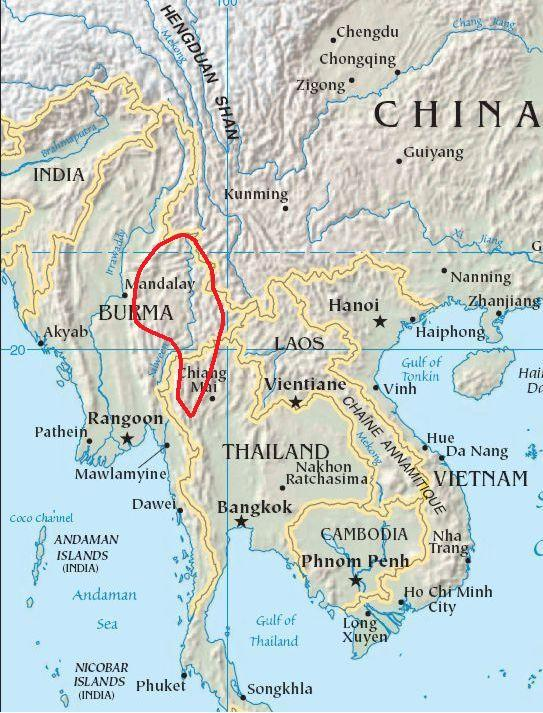
- Location of the Shan Hills
- Countries: Myanmar and Thailand
- Region: Southeast Asia
- Range coordinates: 21°30′N 98°00′E
- Parent range: Indo-Malayan System

Geology
- Rock types: Granite and limestone

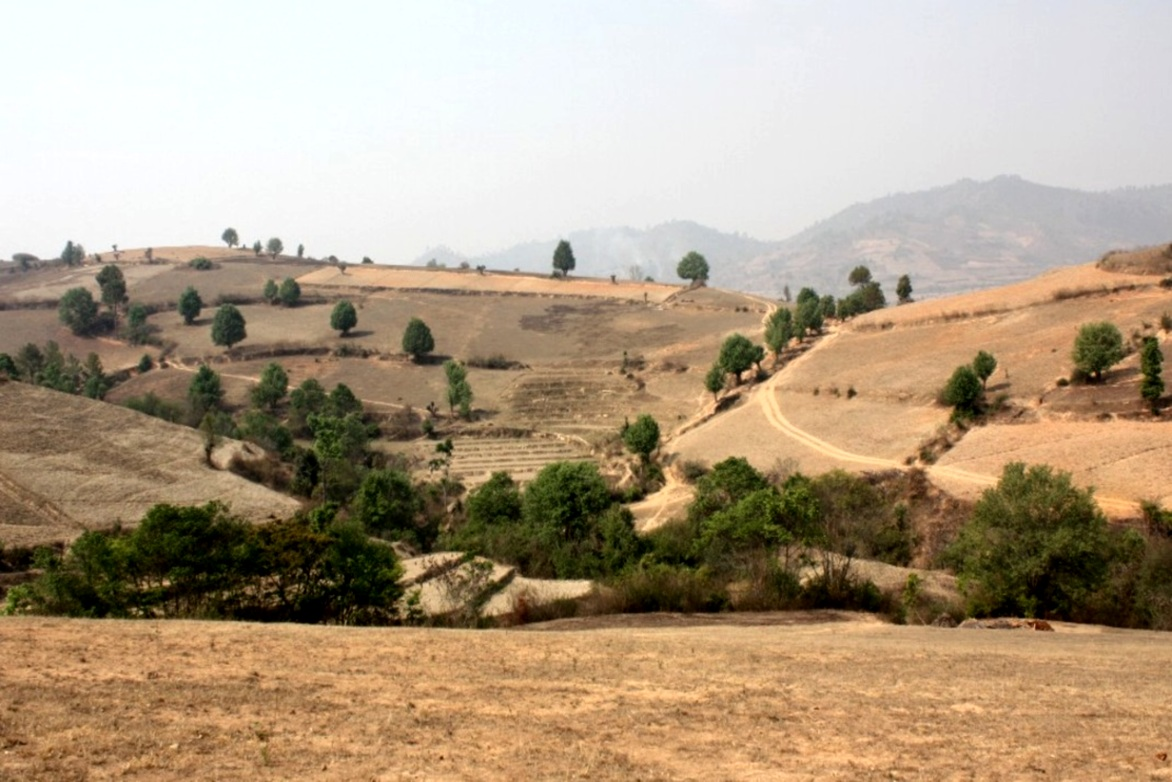
Deforested landscape in the Shan Hills near Kalaw during the dry season

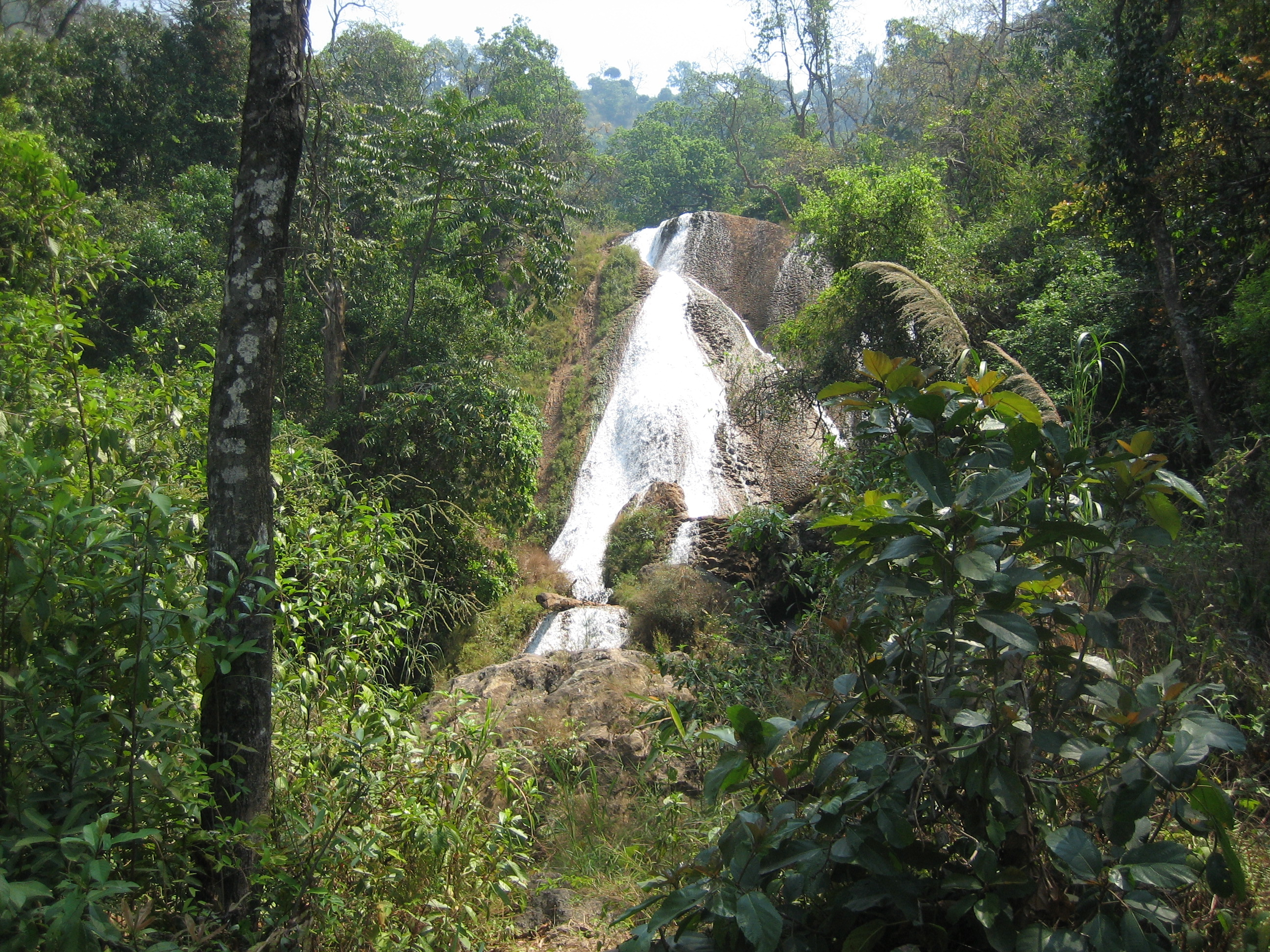
Anishakan waterfall near Pyin U Lwin

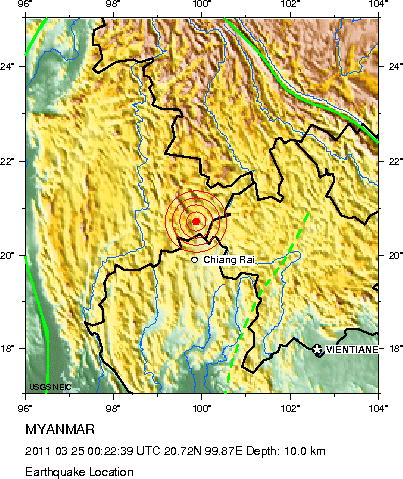
March 2011 earthquake location

The Shan Hills (Burmese: ရှမ်းရိုးမ; Shan Yoma), also known as Shan Highland, is a vast mountainous zone that extends through Yunnan to Myanmar and Thailand. The whole region is made up of numerous peaks separated mostly by narrow valleys, as well as a few broader intermontane basins. The ranges in the area are aligned in such a way that they link to the foothills of the Himalayas further to the northwest.

The highest point is Loi Leng, at an elevation of 2,673 metres (8,770 ft). Other peaks are the 2,565 m (8,415 ft) Mong Ling Shan, 2,565 m (8,415 ft) Doi Inthanon and 2,563 m (8,409 ft) m Loi Pangnao. All are ultra prominent peaks of Southeast Asia.

== Etymology ==
The name of the massif or system of ranges, is derived from the Shan State and its peoples, said in its turn to be derived from the word "Siam", that occupies most of the Shan Highland area.

Since it was relatively unexplored until recent times, the Shan mountainous region was referred to as the "Shan Plateau" in geographic works of the British colonial period, a name that is still sometimes used. However, since the whole area lacks the expanses of relatively flat high terrain which are the main characteristic of a plateau, this label is rather incongruous.

== Geology ==
Geologically in the Shan Hills and their southern subranges, layers of alluvium are superimposed on hard rock. Karstic ranges are common, for large tracts of the hills are limestone. The Shan Hills are an important silver and ruby mining area.

== Geography ==
The area of the Shan Highland is a combination of hill ranges, steep river valleys and a few elevated plains. The area is the primary source of Myanmar's sapphires, rubies and other gems, for which the country is known; it is also a principal source of lead, silver and zinc. The high plain averages about 1,000 metres (3,300 ft) in elevation, and is sparsely populated.

The Shan Hills straddle central eastern Myanmar and northwestern Thailand. They rise steeply from Myanmar's central plain and stretch for hundreds of kilometres eastwards into Thailand's northwest. The surface of the system is cut across by steep river gorges, part of the drainage basins of the Chao Phraya, the Irrawaddy, the Sittaung and the Salween or Thanlwin River which cuts across the plateau in a north–south direction.

=== Subranges ===
- Daen Lao Range. The Daen Lao Range (ทิวเขาแดนลาว) or 'Loi La Range' is in the southern and southeastern area of the Shan Hills. It separates the Salween watershed from the Mekong watershed. The Daen Lao Mountain Range begins at Chiang Saen in the east and Doi Chiang Dao at 2,175 m (7,136 ft) is one of its highest points. The Daen Lao subrange includes Doi Nang Non (The Sleeping Lady), a karstic formation at its southern end with waterfalls and caves.
- Karen Hills. The west end of the Shan Hills system is not clearly defined, with the Karen Hills in the southwestern area of the system beyond the Salween. Geographically the Karen Hills are the southwestern projection of the Shan Hills. They are also referred to as "Kayah-Karen Mountains".
- Thanon Thong Chai Range. The Thanon Thong Chai Range (เทือกเขาถนนธงชัย) is the southernmost prolongation of the Shan Highland system. Southwards from the Daen Lao Range a series of mountain ranges extend in near-parallel fashion above the Shan Plateau rising up to heights of 2,500 m (8,200 ft), with the Dawna Range in the west reaching the beginning of the Tenasserim Hills further south. Doi Inthanon, the highest point in Thailand, reaching 2,565 m (8,415 ft), is part of the Inthanon Range (ทิวเขาอินทนนท์), a high ridge of the Thanon Thong Chai subrange located in Chiang Mai Province. The highest point of the Thanon Thong Chai Range in neighboring Mae Hong Son Province is Doi Mae Ya (ยอดเขาแม่ยะ) at 2,005 m (6,578 ft), on the western side of these mountains in Pai District. Other high peaks of this range are Doi Pui at 1,685 m (5,528 ft) and Doi Suthep at 1,676 m (5,499 ft). Some geographers include the Thanon Thong Chai Range subsystem as part of the Daen Lao Range.

== History ==
In British colonial times, the main hill station in Burma, Pyin Oo Lwin known in English as Maymyo, was built in the western region of the Shan Hills. At 1,000 metres (3,300 ft) above sea level and about one and a half hour drive from Mandalay, it was one of the retreats for colonial officials escaping the heat of the Burmese summer. Pyin Oo Lwin is still known for its botanical gardens and, like all British hill stations, has samples of colonial architecture. Presently Inle Lake near Yawnghwe is one of the tourist attractions of the Shan highlands.

The Taunggyi Bird Sanctuary, established in 1906 as the Taunggyi Wildlife Reserve was redesignated as a bird sanctuary in 1989.

Owing to the insurgency and the activity of the Tatmadaw in the area many local people living in the mountainous areas of the Shan Hills moved across the border to Thailand where they live in refugee camps.

Despite the ongoing insurgency, the Shan Hills grows most of Myanmar's potatoes.

On 24 March 2011, a magnitude 6.8 earthquake struck in Tarlay, Tachileik Township, in the Daen Lao range area on the eastern part of the hill system. It killed more than 70 and injured more than 100 people. Three hundred-ninety houses, 14 Buddhist monasteries and nine government buildings were damaged.

== Features ==
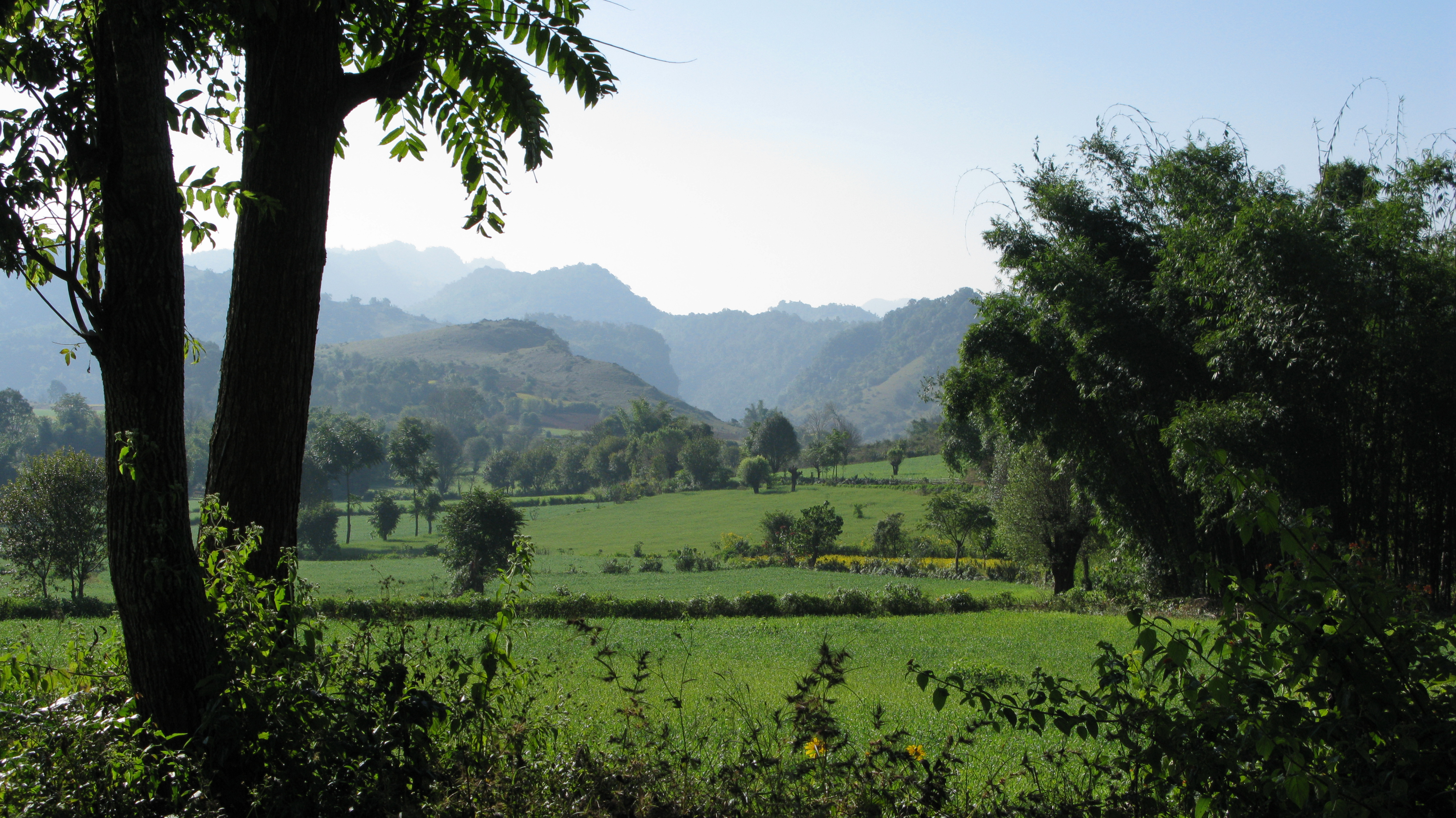
Hilly landscape in Kalaw area, Shan Hills, Myanmar

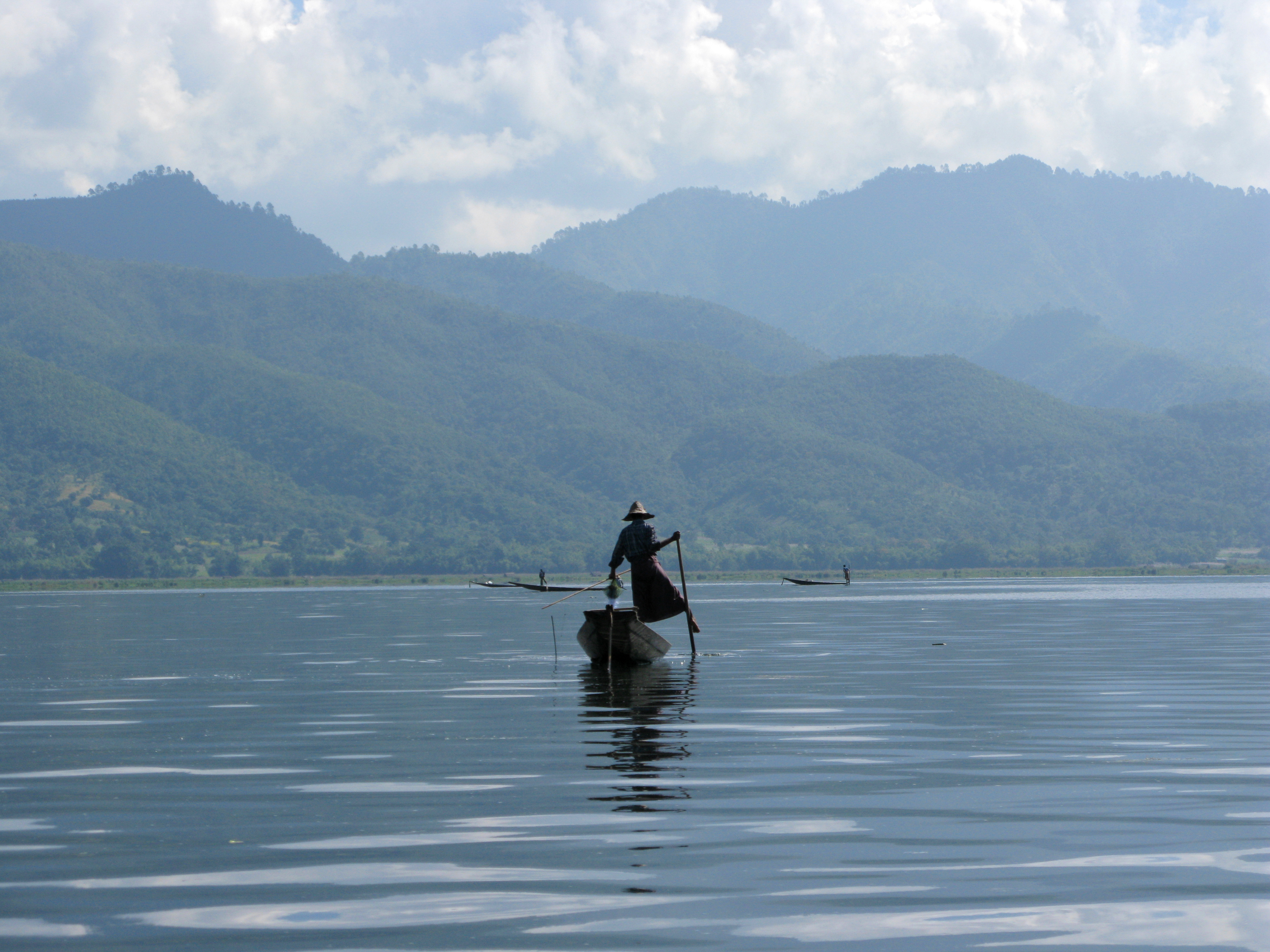
The Shan Hills as seen from Inle Lake

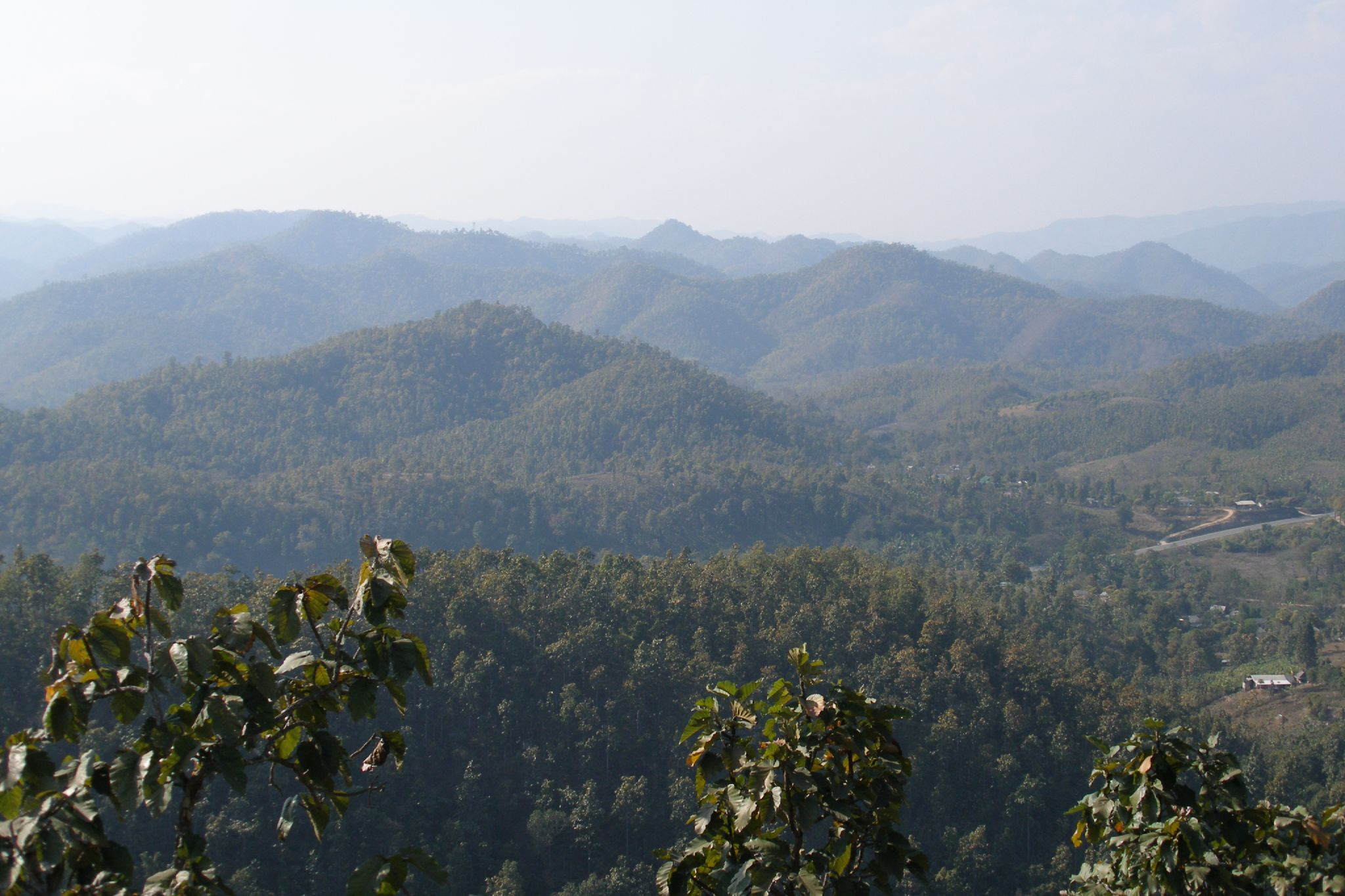
The Shan Hills in Mae Hong Son Province

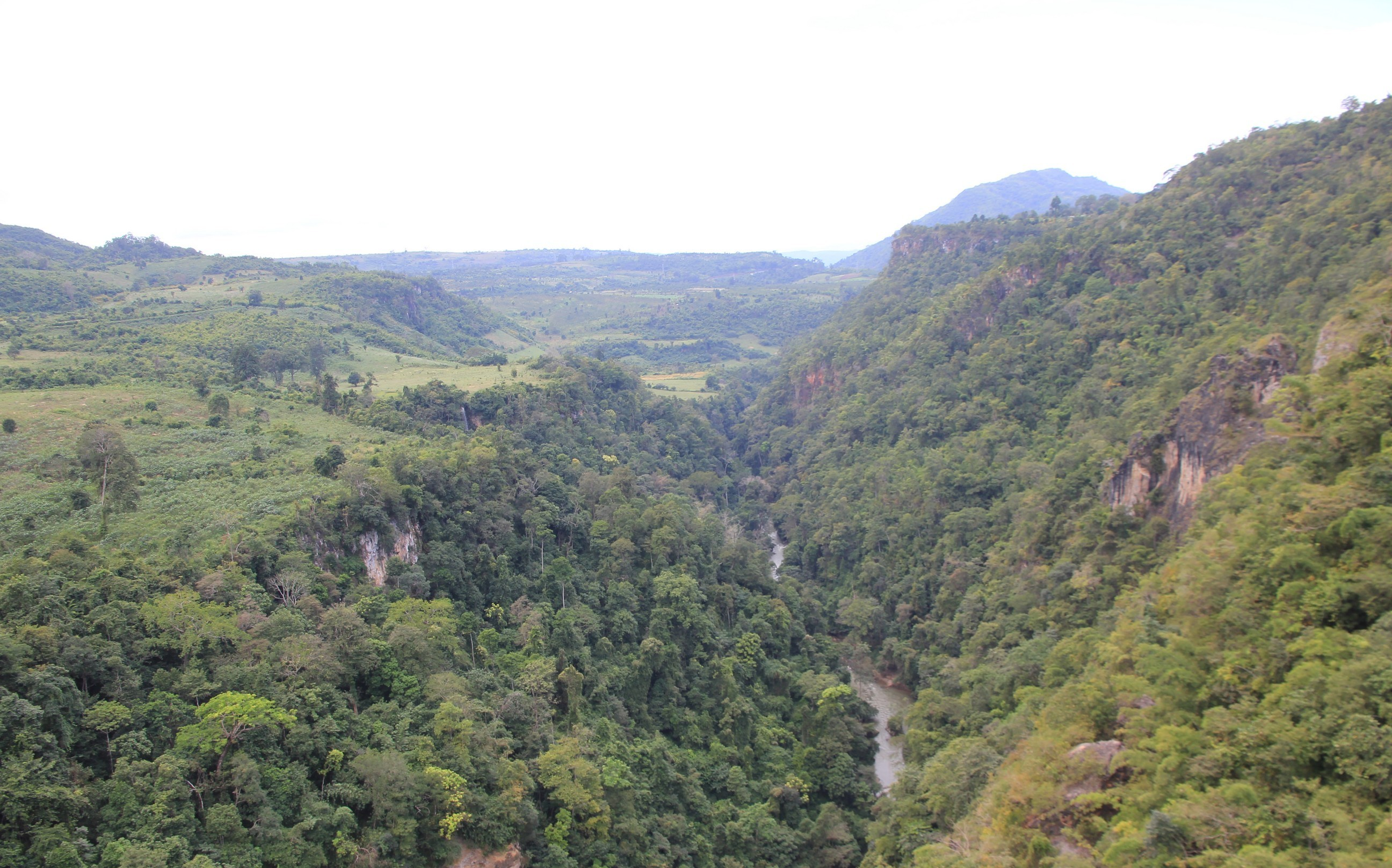
View over the Gokteik Gorge between Hsipaw and Pyin U Lwin

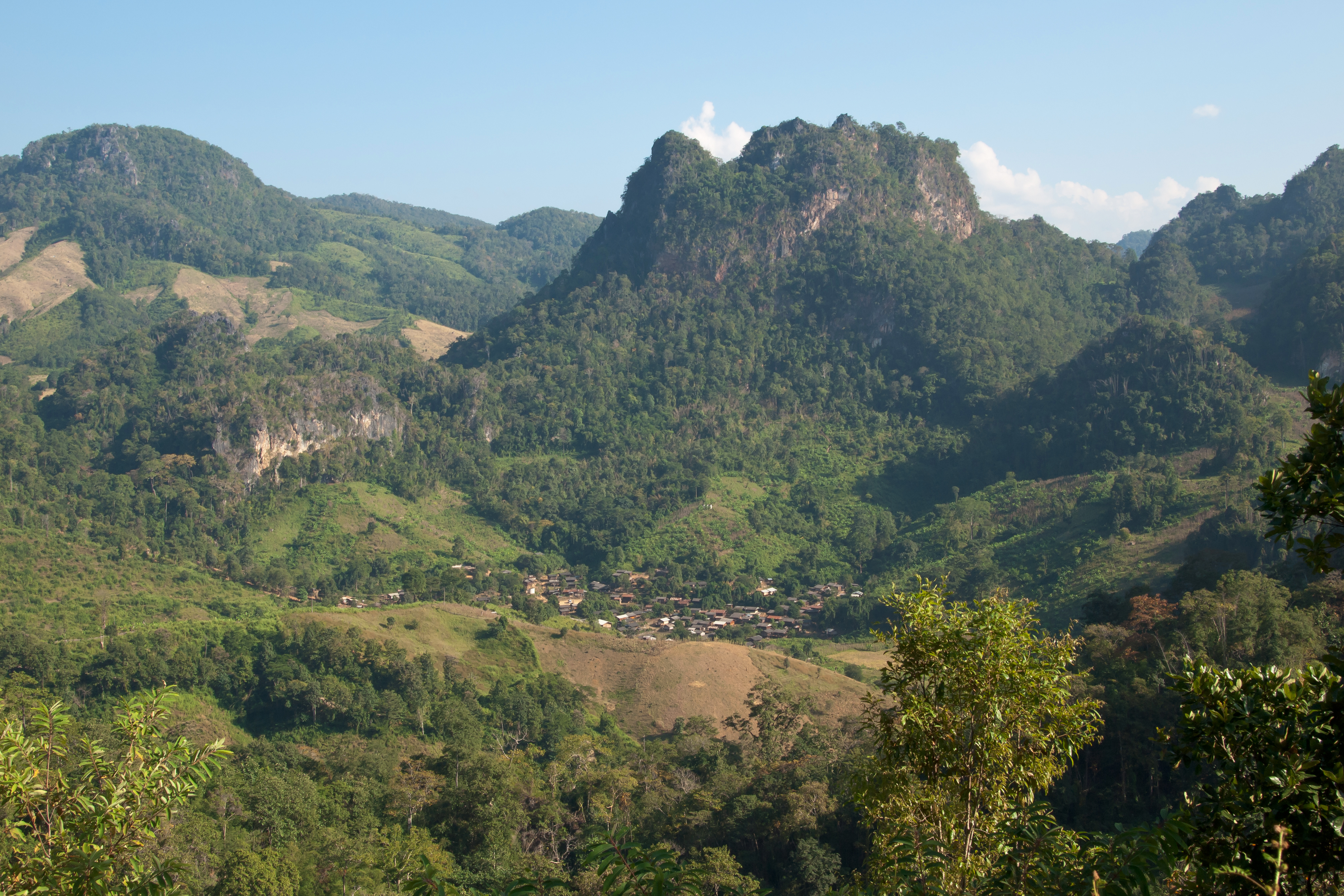
The Shan Hills between Chiang Mai and the border with Myanmar

== See also ==
- List of Ultras of Southeast Asia
- Doi Inthanon
- Zomia (geography)
