= Taunggyi Bird Sanctuary =

- IUCN category IV (habitat/species management area)
- Location within Myanmar
- Location: Myanmar
- Nearest city: Taunggyi Township, Shan State, Myanmar
- Coordinates: 20°43′00″N 97°05′00″E
- Area: 16 km^{2} (6.2 sq mi)
- Established: 1906
- Governing body: Myanmar Forest Department

Taunggyi Bird Sanctuary is a protected area in Myanmar's Shan Hills at an elevation of 1,045–1,750 m (3,428–5,741 ft). It covers 16 km^{2} (6.2 sq mi) of dry hill forest. It was established in 1906 under the name Taunggyi Wildlife Reserve and was redesignated as bird sanctuary in 1989.
