= Tachileik =

Tachileik ၼွင်တၶျီႇလီႇ တာချီလိတ်မြို့
- Town
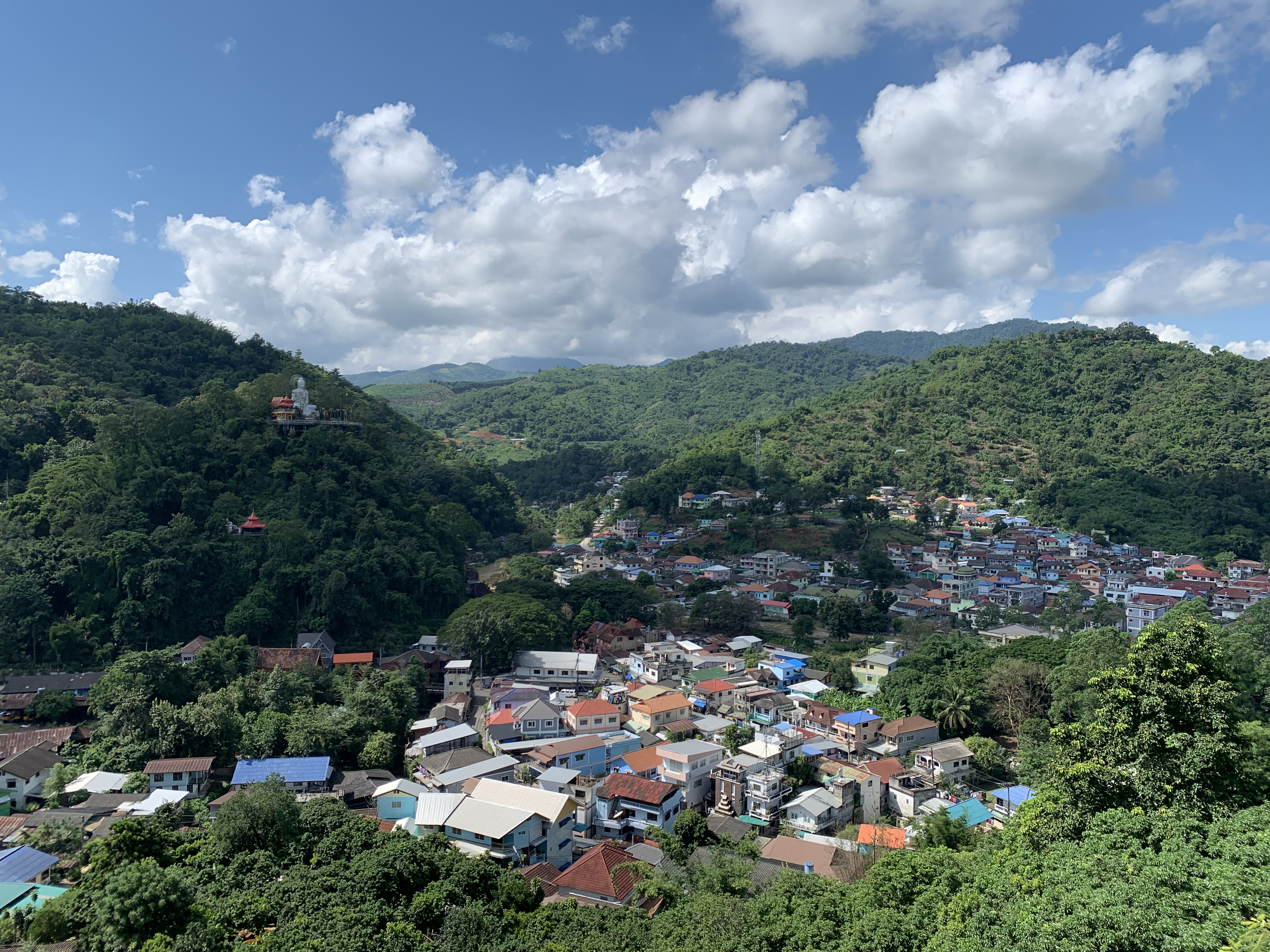
- Skyline of Tachileik on the Daen Lao Range, seen from Thailand's Wat Phra That Doi Wao

- Location in Myanmar
- Coordinates: 20°27′10″N 99°53′45″E
- Country: Myanmar
- State: Shan State
- District: Tachileik
- Township: Tachileik Township

Population (2014)
  - Total: 51,553
  - Ethnicities: Shan
  - Religions: Buddhism
- Time zone: UTC+6.30 (MST)

Tachileik (also spelt Tachilek; Burmese: တာချီလိတ်, [tà tɕʰì leɪʔ]; Shan: တႃႈၶီႈလဵၵ်း, [tɑ᷆.kʰi᷆.lék]; Thai: ท่าขี้เหล็ก, RTGS: Tha Khilek, [tʰâː.kʰîː.lèk]) is a border town in Shan State of eastern Myanmar. It is the administrative seat of Tachileik Township and Tachileik District and most populated city in eastern Shan State with 51,553 residents per 2014 census count, ahead of Kyaing Tong, but only 4th statewide. It faces Mae Sai in Thailand, and is home to one of Myanmar's seven official border trade posts with Thailand.

== History ==
Tachileik was a border crossing probably used in the opium trade from the Golden Triangle and was the town that the drug lord Khun Sa used to live in.

On 24 March 2011, a 6.8 magnitude earthquake struck the region very close to Tachileik. It caused some damage as far away as Chiang Mai.

On 24 March 2012 a bomb wounded 2 people at the Regina Hotel golf course in Tachileik, followed by a second bomb that exploded an hour later.

== Economy ==
The border trade post with Thailand opened on 16 March 1996. In 2022, total trade volume at the border post stood at US$130.664 million.

In 2009, it was reported that Tachileik vendors openly sold endangered animal parts. Located immediately following the bridge that divides Myanmar and Thailand is a marketplace that sells a large variety of products, including DVDs, perfume, clothing, luggage and wine.

Tachileik once had the reputation as a distribution nexus for heroin and ya ba (methamphetamine pills) moving from rural Myanmar to the world market.

== Tourism ==
The main tourist attraction is a large gold-coloured stupa, which, among other things, showcases the seven days of the week. The idea is for a pilgrim to go to the spot which has the day he/she was born known as the planetary post, and do a simple spiritual worship.

West of town there are hiking trails, though currently they are designated for locals, not for tourists. There is an Akha hill tribe, over an hour's walk north-west of Tachilek called Ho Yu. There are no maps and no guides for such excursions, and Burmese authorities frown on foreign visitors leaving the beaten track.

Pasa Wildlife Reserve is located in the eastern side of the district.

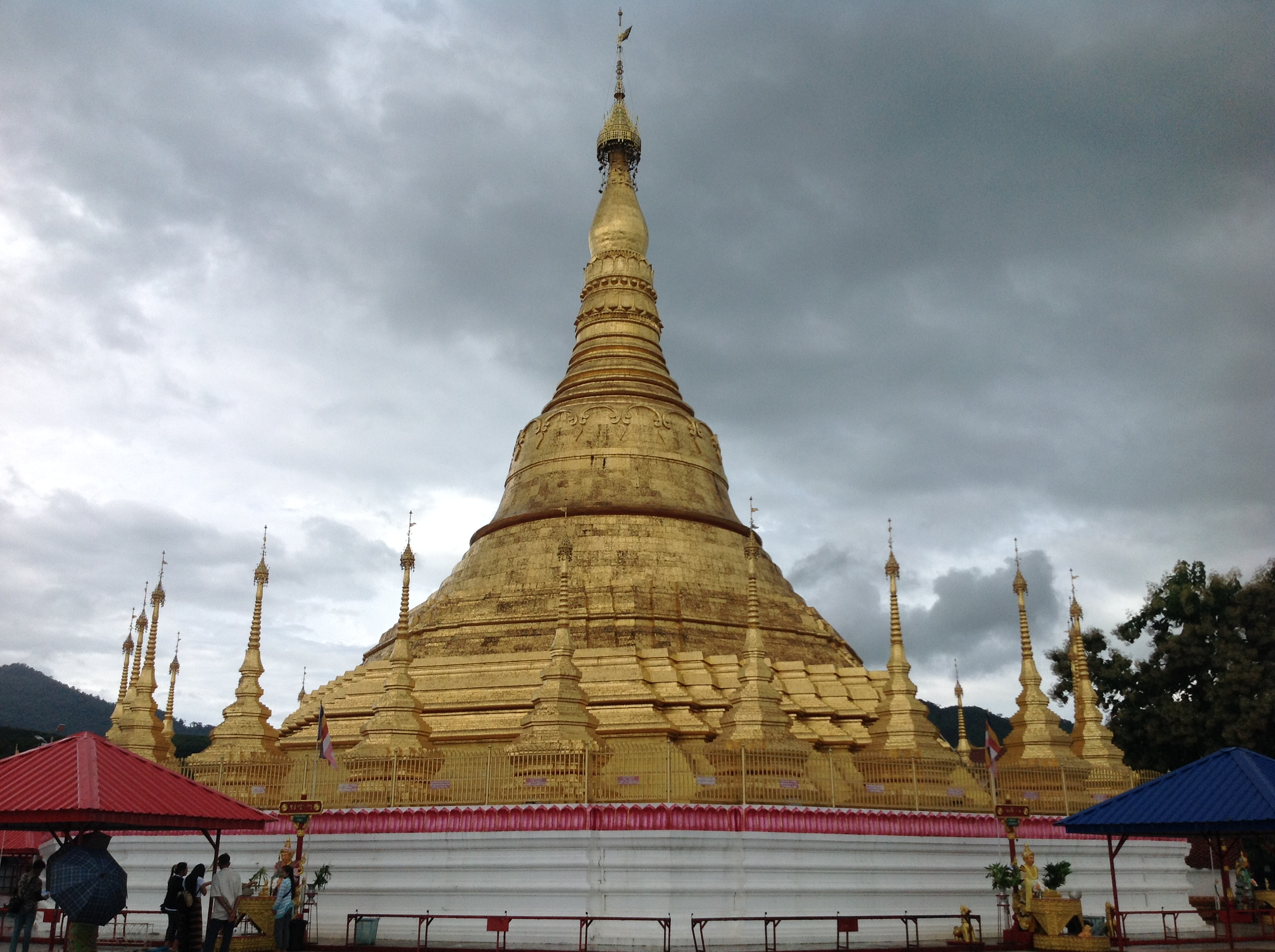
Tachileik Shwedagon Pagoda

== Transport ==
Tachileik has an airport which links to four Burmese cities – Yangon, Mandalay, Taunggyi Heho and Kengtung. By road Tachileik is connected to Kengtung, which lies 106 km (66 miles) to the north, by the Asian Highway route AH2, and via Kengtung west to Taunggyi, capital of Shan State, and east by route AH3 to Mongla and on to Yunnan Province, China.

== Climate ==
Climate data for Tachileik
Month	Jan	Feb	Mar	Apr	May	Jun	Jul	Aug	Sep	Oct	Nov	Dec	Year
Mean daily maximum °C (°F)	28 (82)	31 (88)	33 (91)	35 (95)	33 (91)	32 (90)	31 (88)	31 (88)	31 (88)	30 (86)	28 (82)	26 (79)	31 (87)
Mean daily minimum °C (°F)	12 (54)	13 (55)	16 (61)	20 (68)	22 (72)	23 (73)	23 (73)	23 (73)	22 (72)	20 (68)	17 (63)	13 (55)	19 (66)
Average rainfall mm (inches)	15 (0.6)	8 (0.3)	20 (0.8)	73 (2.9)	186 (7.3)	204 (8.0)	276 (10.9)	342 (13.5)	224 (8.8)	128 (5.0)	59 (2.3)	22 (0.9)	1,557 (61.3)
Average rainy days	5	3	3	10	18	21	23	25	19	14	8	6	155
Mean monthly sunshine hours	248	252	248	240	217	150	124	155	180	186	210	217	2,427
Source: World Climate Guide

== Border crossing ==
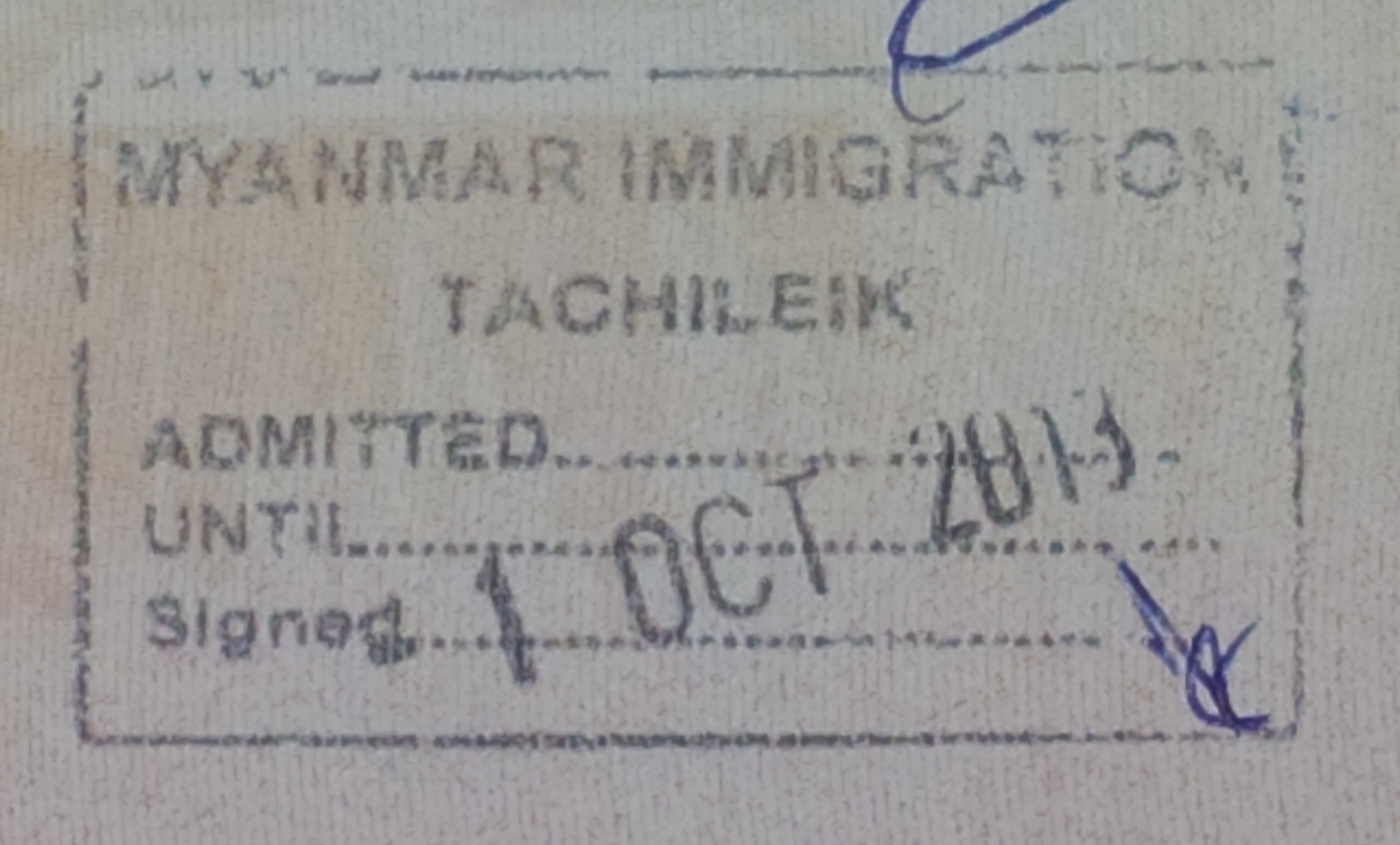
Entry stamp issued at Tachileik

Tachileik can be accessed from the Thai town of Mae Sai, which sits directly south on the other side of the small Mae Sai River. There are two bridges that provide access between Mae Sai and Tachilek.

It is a porous border and is not difficult to wade across the river. Burmese merchants used to be able to cross over and do business in Mae Sai for days at a time. The border is also a popular destination for Westerners who either reside in or are visiting Thailand and who need to get their passport visas renewed.

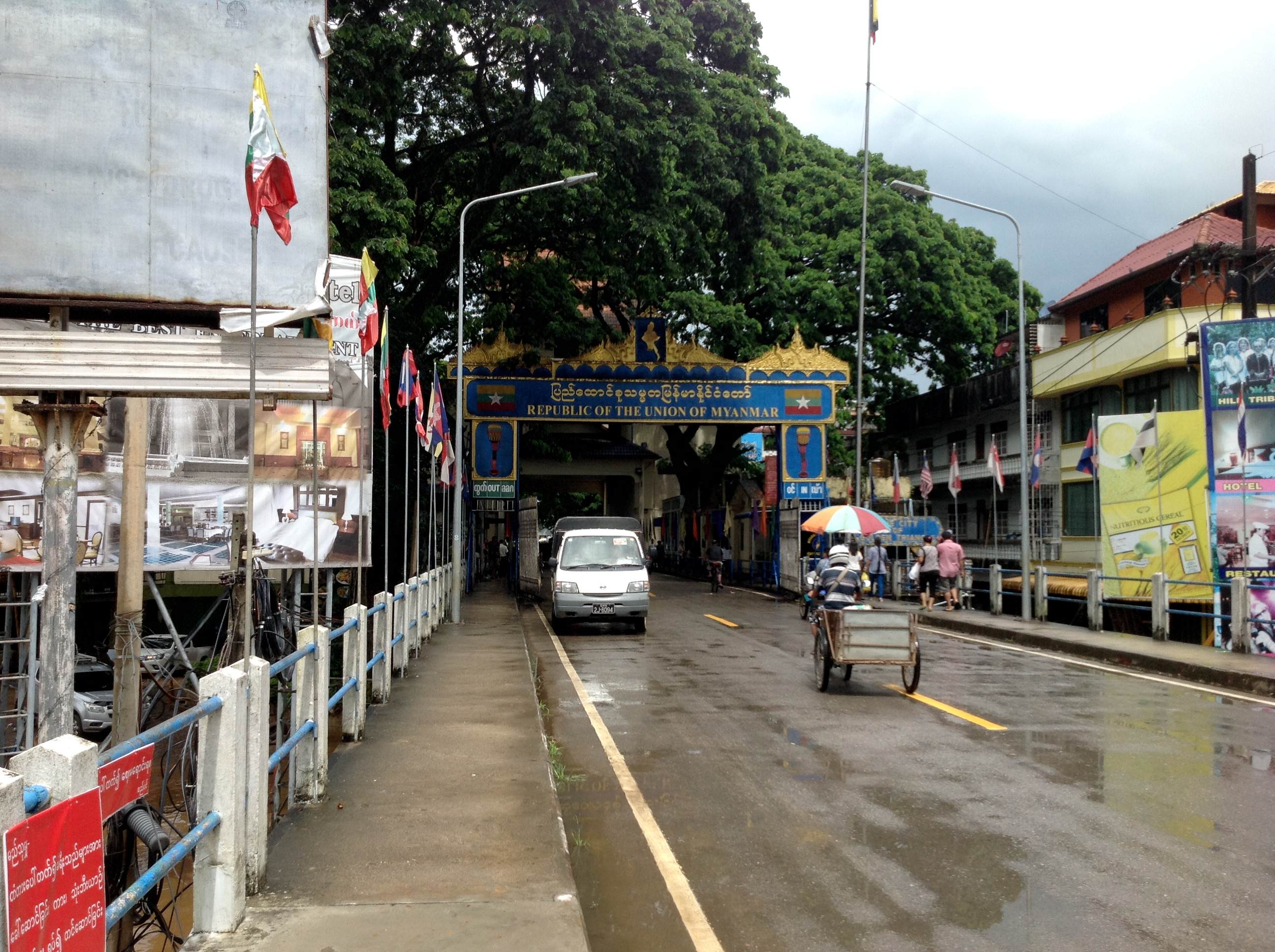
Thailand-Myanmar Bridge

There is no charge for a 'visa run' going from Thailand to Burma on the Thai side, but there is a charge of US$10 or 500 Thai Baht on the Burmese side.

== Health care ==
- Tachileik General Hospital
