= Doi Ang Khang =

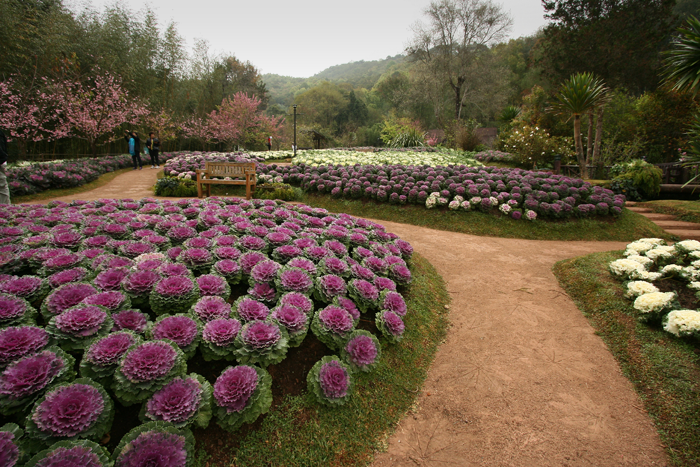
- Doi Ang Khang park

Highest point
- Elevation: 1,400 m (4,600 ft)
- Coordinates: 19°54′1.2″N 99°2′21.5″E

Geography
- Location within Thailand
- Location: Ban Khum Village, Mu 5, Mae Ngon Sub district, Amphoe Fang, Chiang Mai Province
- Parent range: Daen Lao Range

Geology
- Mountain type: Limestone

Climbing
- Easiest route: drive

Doi Ang Khang (Thai: ดอยอ่างขาง) is a mountain in Fang District, Chiang Mai Province, Thailand. It is part of the Daen Lao Range that straddles both sides of the Burmese-Thai border. It is the site of an agricultural station, the first research station set up by King Bhumibol Adulyadej in 1969. The peak of Doi Ang Khang is 1,928 metres (6,325 ft) above sea level, and the agricultural station covers an area of 1,989 rai (318 ha).

== Climate ==
The temperature average is 19.6 °C. The highest temperatures range from 35-38 °C in April. The lowest temperature recorded is -3 °C in January. The rainfall average is 1906 mm per year.

Climate data for Doi Ang Khang (1981–2010)
Month	Jan	Feb	Mar	Apr	May	Jun	Jul	Aug	Sep	Oct	Nov	Dec	Year
Mean daily maximum °C (°F)	20.0 (68.0)	23.0 (73.4)	26.2 (79.2)	27.4 (81.3)	24.3 (75.7)	24.0 (75.2)	22.9 (73.2)	22.4 (72.3)	22.6 (72.7)	21.6 (70.9)	19.8 (67.6)	18.7 (65.7)	22.7 (72.9)
Daily mean °C (°F)	16.8 (62.2)	19.3 (66.7)	22.2 (72.0)	23.2 (73.8)	21.1 (70.0)	21.0 (69.8)	20.3 (68.5)	19.9 (67.8)	20.0 (68.0)	19.0 (66.2)	17.2 (63.0)	15.9 (60.6)	19.6 (67.3)
Mean daily minimum °C (°F)	13.0 (55.4)	15.0 (59.0)	17.5 (63.5)	18.6 (65.5)	17.6 (63.7)	17.8 (64.0)	17.7 (63.9)	17.7 (63.9)	17.5 (63.5)	16.8 (62.2)	14.3 (57.7)	12.6 (54.7)	16.3 (61.3)
Average rainfall mm (inches)	18.8 (0.74)	10.5 (0.41)	17.7 (0.70)	96.1 (3.78)	279.3 (11.00)	179.0 (7.05)	321.2 (12.65)	403.3 (15.88)	297.9 (11.73)	246.6 (9.71)	34.4 (1.35)	1.3 (0.05)	1,906.2 (75.05)
Average relative humidity (%)	63.8	46.8	45.9	58.8	79.7	84.5	87.5	90.7	88.5	88.4	76.7	72.9	73.7
Mean monthly sunshine hours	272.8	240.1	275.9	243.0	198.4	159.0	161.2	158.1	183.0	198.4	249.0	251.1	2,590
Percentage possible sunshine	80	76	75	65	49	40	40	40	50	56	75	75	59
Source 1: Thai Meteorological Department
Source 2: Office of Water Management and Hydrology, Royal Irrigation Department (sunshine)

== Ang Khang Royal Agricultural Station ==
The agricultural station researches and cultivates temperate climate fruits, flowers, and vegetables. At present, the station has more than 12 species of temperate fruits such as raspberries, peaches, plums, kiwis, and strawberries, and more than 60 species of vegetables such as carrots, Brussels sprouts, and peas, and more than 50 species of temperate flowers such as carnations and roses.

== Gallery ==
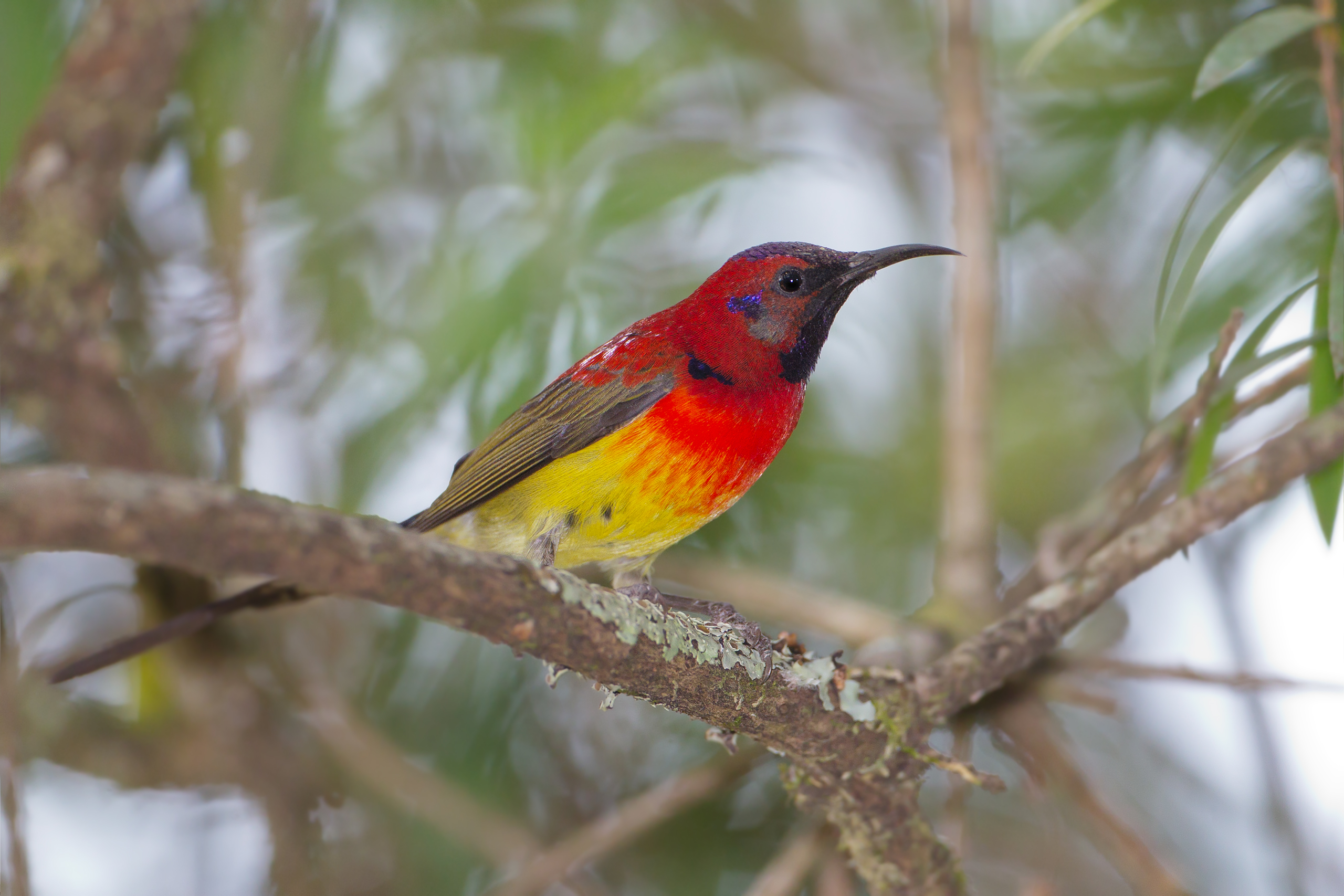
Mrs Gould's sunbird

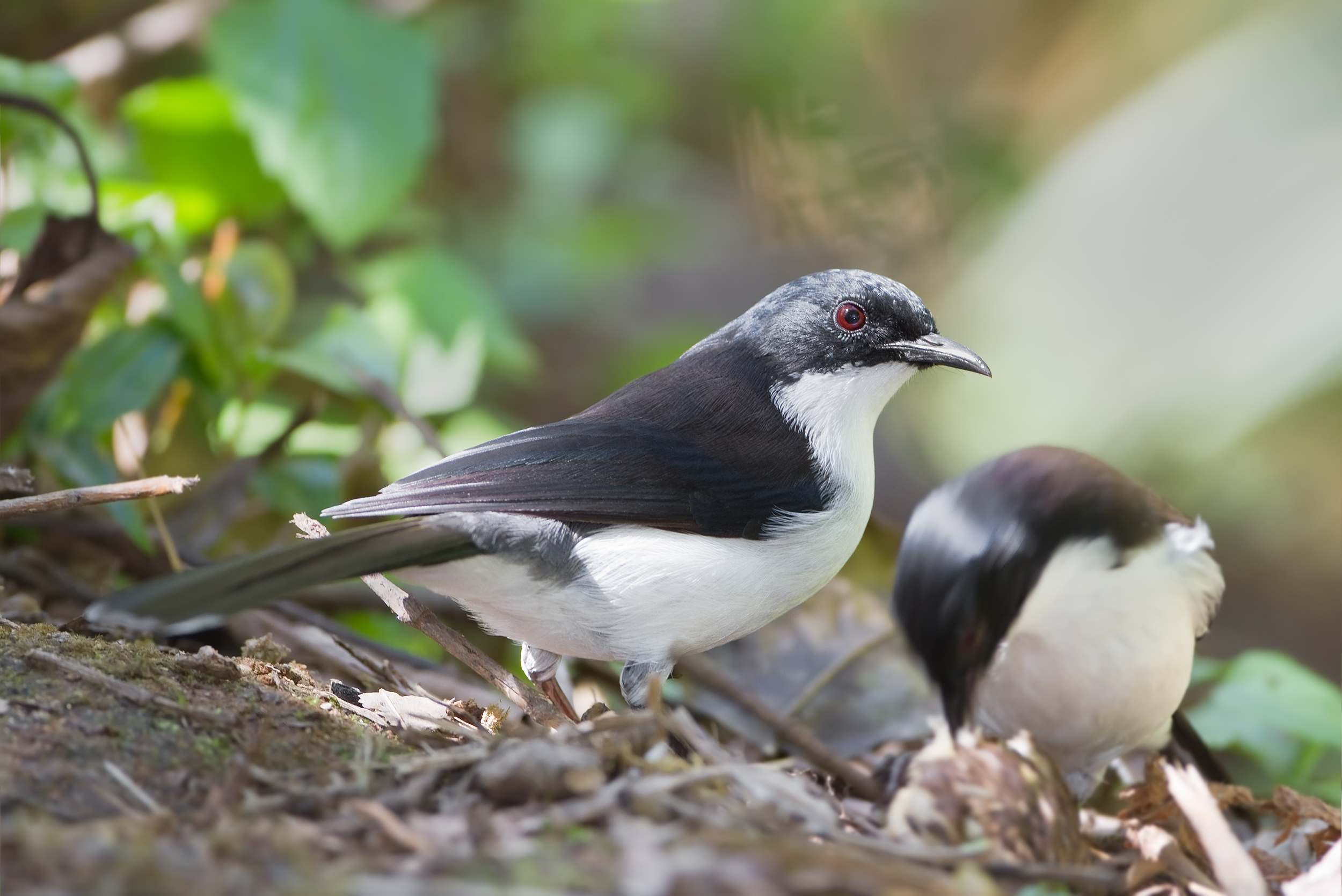
Dark-backed sibia

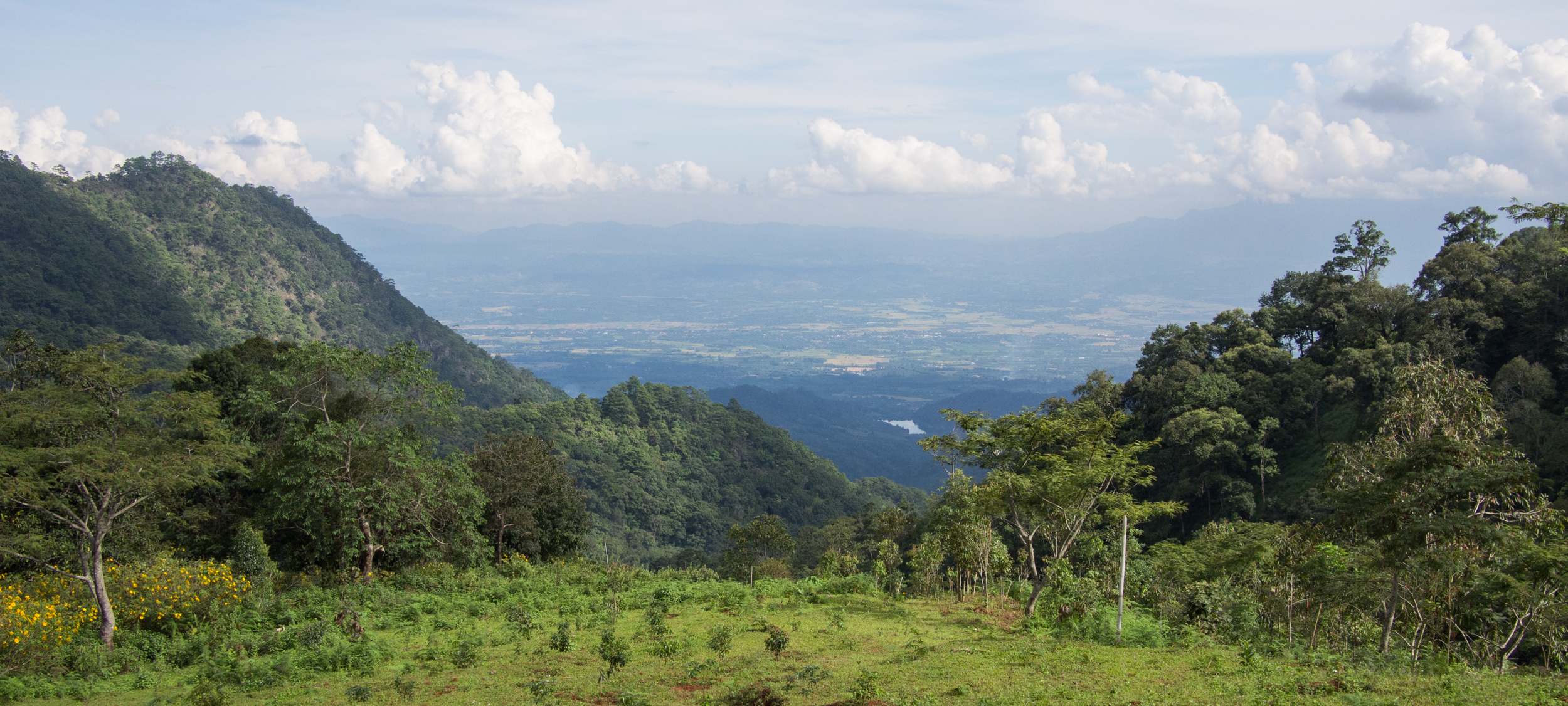
Fang Valley from one of the two access roads to Doi Ang Khang

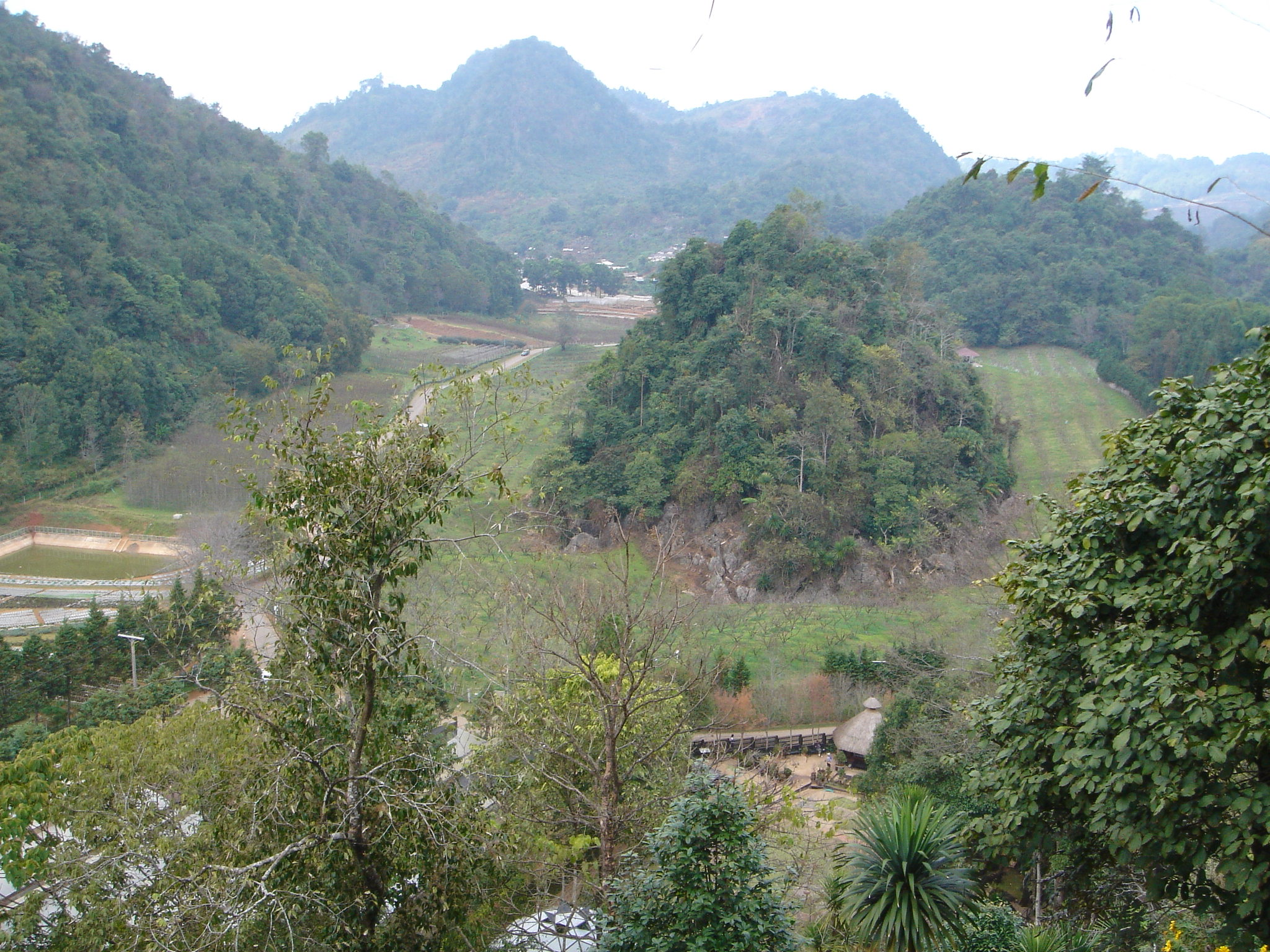
Ang Khang Royal Agricultural Station
