= Mong Yawng =

- Town
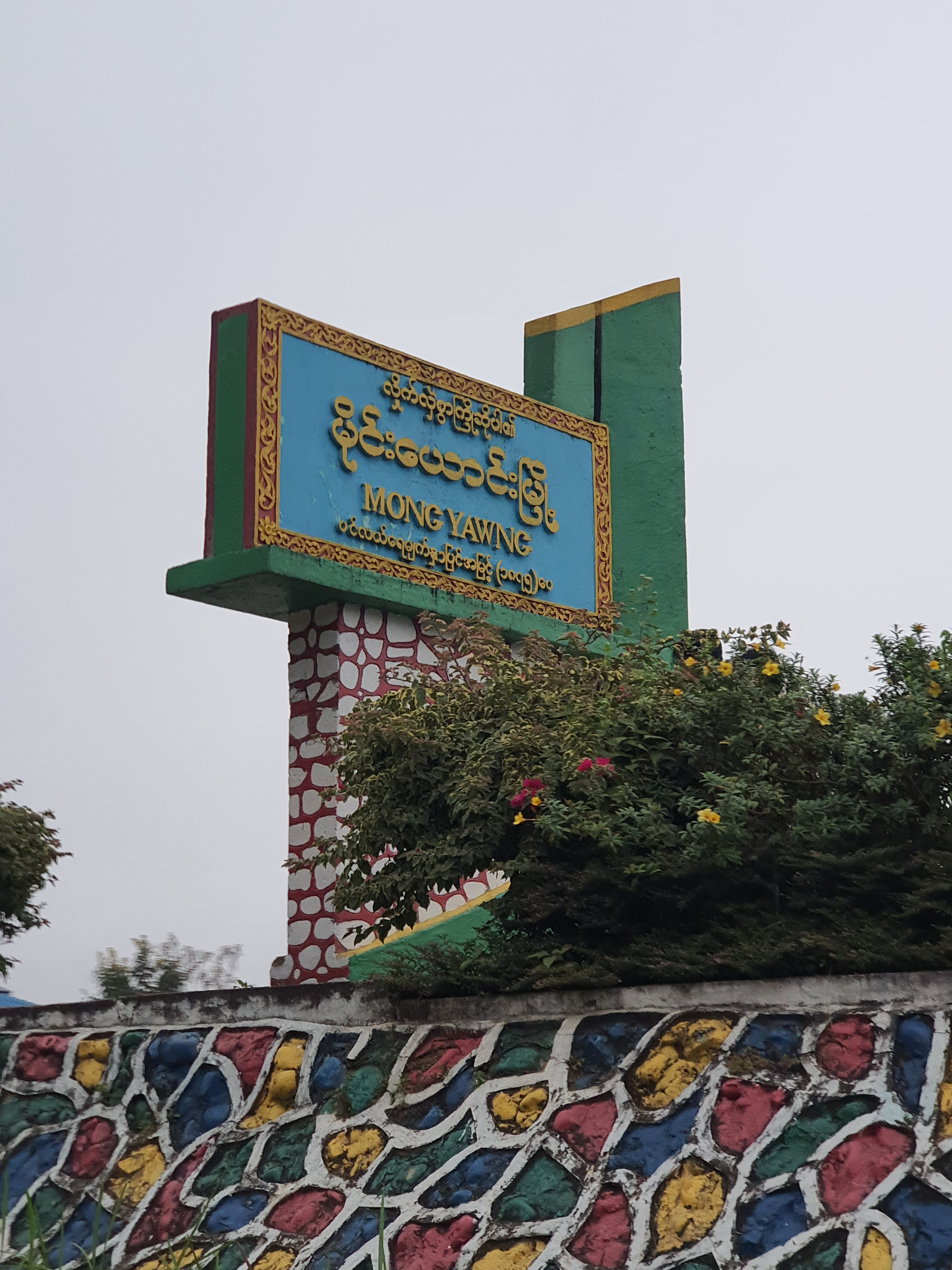

- Location in Burma
- Coordinates: 21°11′0″N 100°22′0″E
- Country: Burma
- Region: Shan State
- District: Tachileik District
- Township: Mong Yawng Township

Population
  - Ethnicities: Shan Wa Arkha
  - Religions: Theravada Buddhism
- Time zone: UTC+6.30 (MST)

Mong Yawng (Burmese: မိုင်းယောင်းမြို့) is a town, located in eastern Shan State, Myanmar.

== History ==
Mongyawng State (Möngyawng) was one of the Shan States. It was annexed by Kengtung State in 1815. Mong Yawng was the capital of the State.
