= Pai River =

River in Thailand and Myanmar

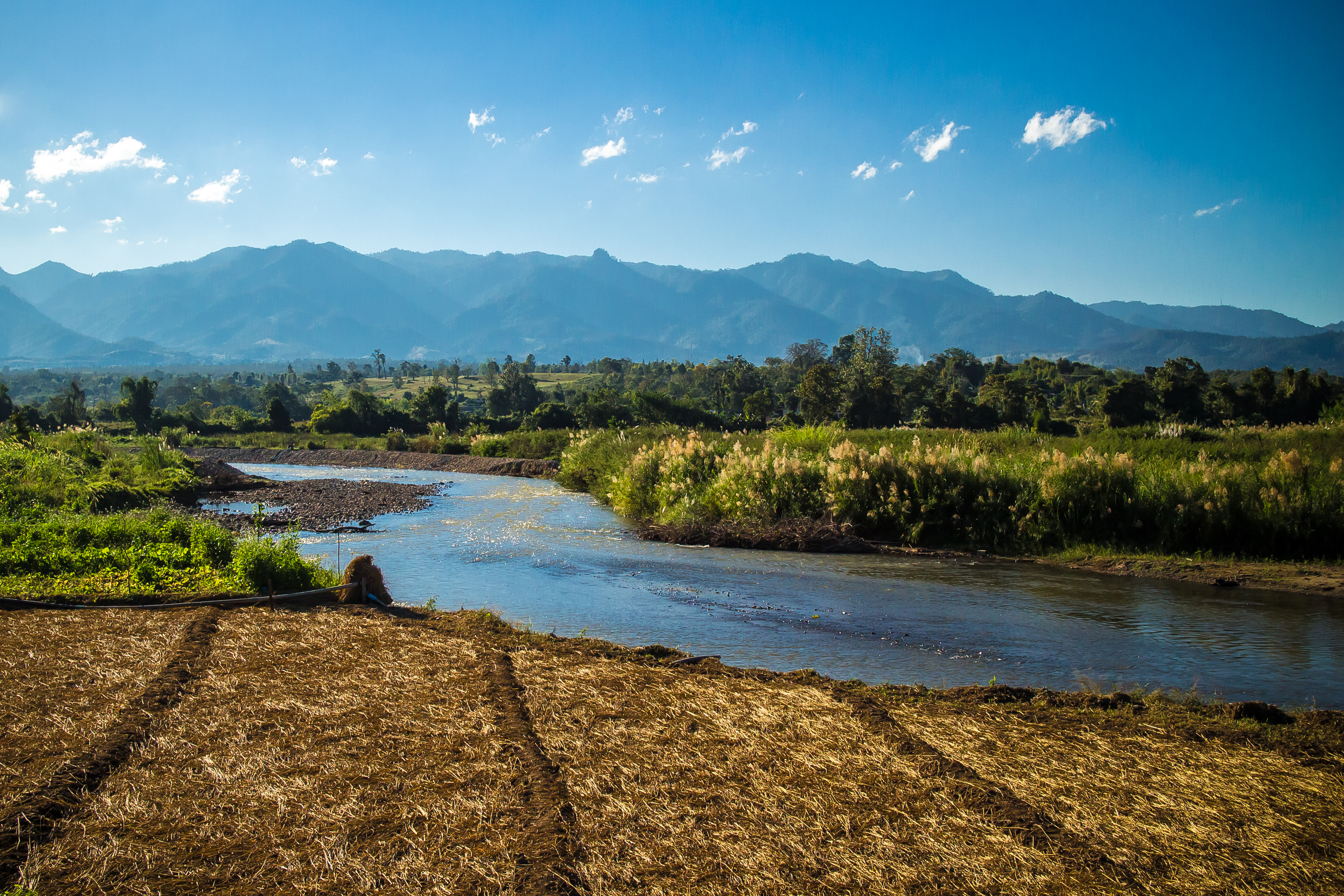
- Pai River near Mae Hong Son, Thailand

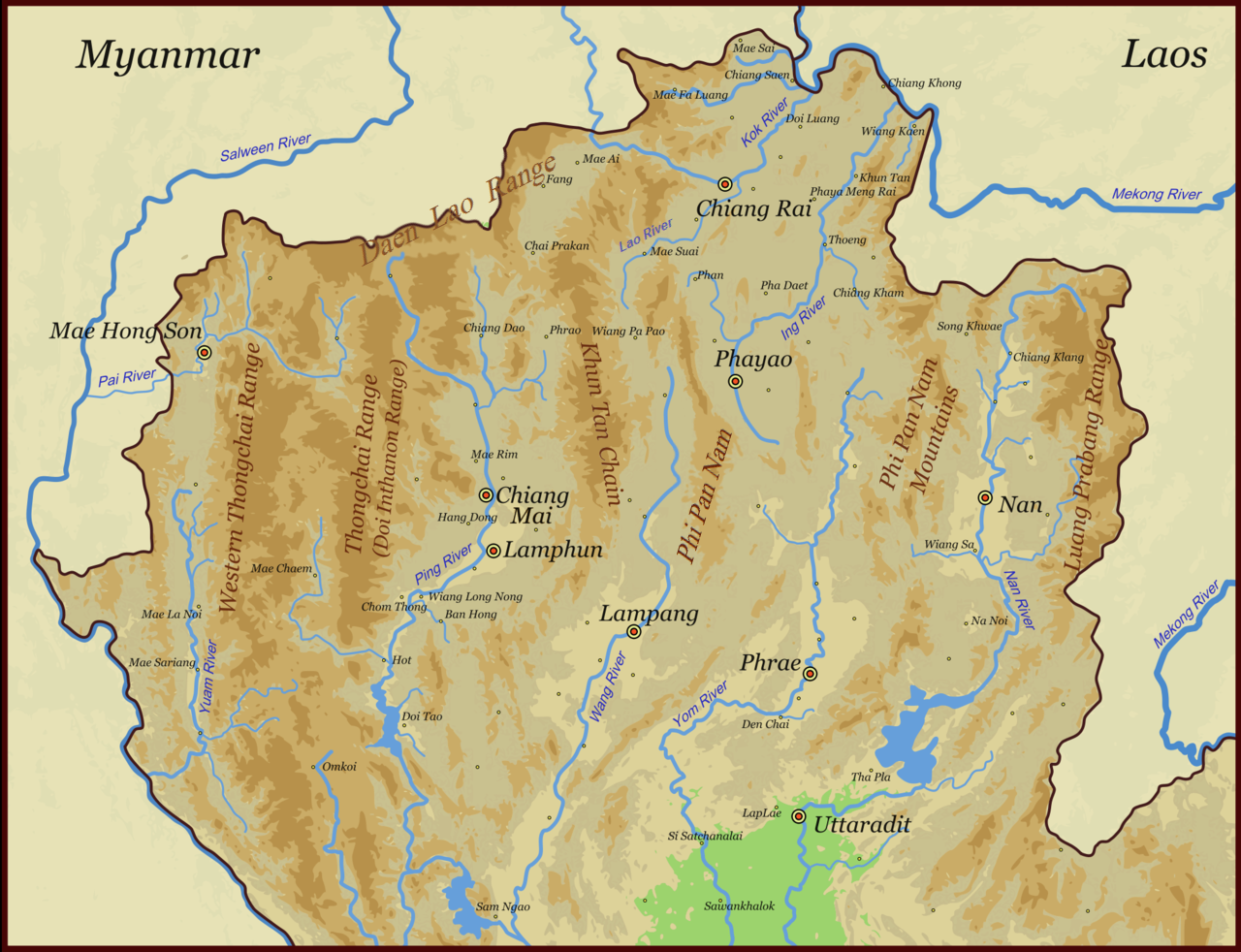
- Map of the Thai highlands

Location
- Country: Thailand, Myanmar
- State: Mae Hong Son Province (Thailand), Kayah State (Myanmar)

Physical characteristics
- Source
  - location: Daen Lao Range, Pai district, Mae Hong Son province, Thailand
  - coordinates: 19°27′0″N 98°29′20″E
  - elevation: 1,170 m (3,840 ft)
- Mouth: Salween
  - location: Punghsa-se, Kayah State, Myanmar
  - coordinates: 19°08′45″N 97°32′40″E
  - elevation: 111 m (364 ft)
- Length: 180 km (110 mi)

The Pai River (Thai: แม่น้ำปาย, Thai pronunciation: [mɛ̂ːnáːm paːj]; RTGS: Maenam Pai) is a river that originates in the mountains of the Daen Lao Range, in Pai district, Mae Hong Son province, Thailand. It flows first in a north–south direction and then east–west, down to Mueang Mae Hong Son district and across the Thai/Myanmar border. The river flows into the Salween River in Kayah State, Myanmar. It is 180 kilometres (110 mi) long.

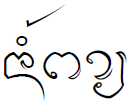
In the Lanna language ( ), "Pai" means "male elephant", comparable to the word "plai" in the central Thai language. There is a story that in 1477, King Tilokaraj, ruler of the Lanna Kingdom, ordered his cousin Prince Si Chaiya to attack Ban Don. Meanwhile, one of his white elephants fled, and it was later found swimming in this river.

Pai River is popular for whitewater rafting. Rapids on the river range from class I to class IV on the International Scale of River Difficulty.

== See also ==
- River systems of Thailand
