= Möng Yawng =

Coordinates: 21°11′N 100°22′E

- State of the Shan States
- c. 13th century–1815
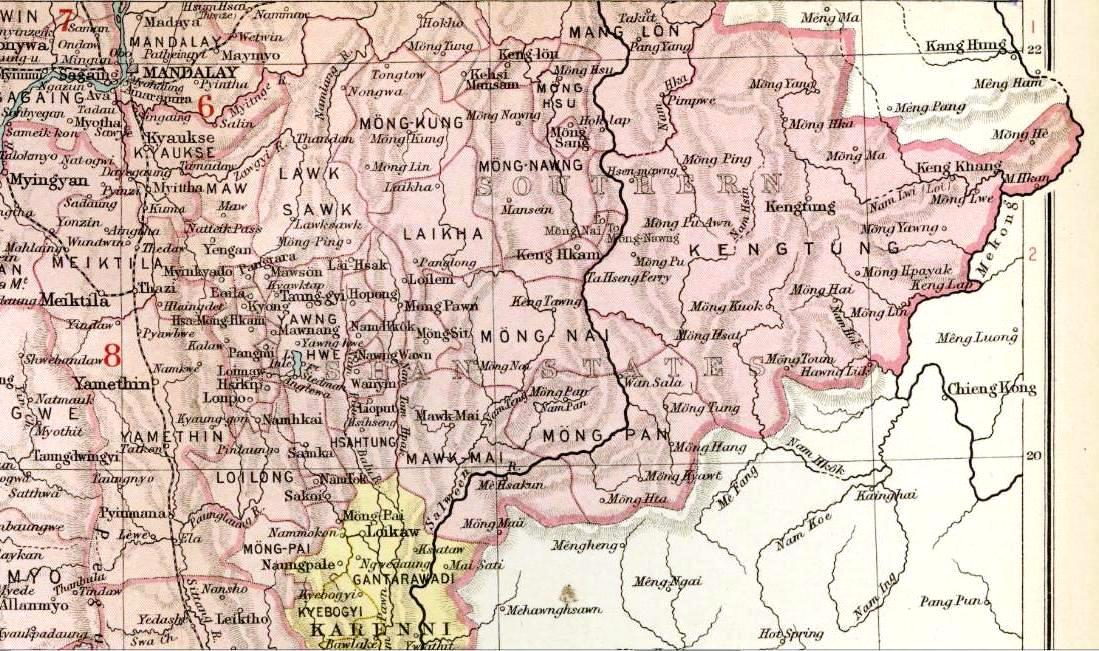
- Möng Yawng in an Imperial Gazetteer of India map
- History
  - Foundation of the state: c. 13th century
  - Annexed by Kengtung State: 1815
Preceded by	Succeeded by
Konbaung Dynasty	Kengtung State

Möng Yawng, also spelled Moeng Yòng, was a small Shan state centered around the town of Möng Yawng.

== History ==
Möng Yawng was founded around the late 13th to early 14th centuries. It had its capital at Möng Yawng town. The state was inhabited mainly by Wa people.

The state was occupied by Siam until 1814 and subsequently annexed by Kengtung State in 1815.

=== Rulers ===
The rulers of Möng Yawng had the title Myoza.

- c.17.. - 17.. Tao Luk
- 17.. - 17.. Tao Ngam
- 17.. - 17.. Sunabnta
- 17.. - 17.. Sulang Ka Wutti
- (17.. - .... Inta Wasai
- .... - .... ....
- .... - .... Hsai Ya Kuman I
- .... - .... Hsen Sulin (Surin Pumintha)
- .... - .... Hsai Ya Kuman II
- .... - .... Sao Yawt
- 1814 - 1815 Maha Hkanan
- 1815 Buddha Wong

== See also ==
- Mong Yawng Yazawin
