= Tachileik Township =

Tachileik တာချီလိတ်မြို့နယ်
- Township
- Location in Tachileik district
- Coordinates: 20°27′00″N 99°53′30″E
- Country: Myanmar
- State: Shan State
- District: Tachileik District
- Capital: Tachileik
- Time zone: UTC+6.30 (MMT)

Tachileik Township is a township of Tachileik District in eastern Shan State of Myanmar (formerly Burma). The principal town is Tachileik.
