= Tachileik District =

- District
- ၸႄႈတွၼ်ႈၼွင်တၶျီႇလီႇ တာချီလိတ်ခရိုင်
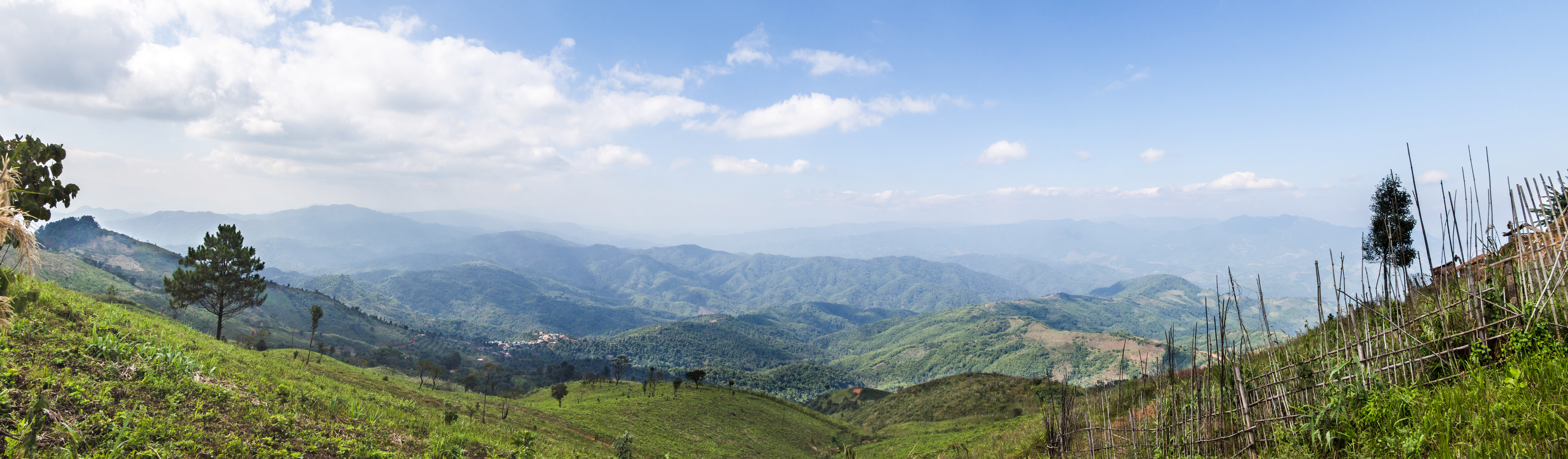
- Looking over Tachileik District, into the heart of the Daen Lao Range

- Location in Shan State
- Coordinates: 20°41′00″N 100°2′30″E
- Country: Myanmar
- State: Shan State
- Capital: Tachileik
- Time zone: UTC+6:30 (MST)

Tachileik District (Burmese: တာချီလိတ်ခရိုင်; Thai: ท่าขี้เหล็ก, RTGS: Tha Khilek, pronounced [tʰâː.kʰîː.lèk], Thai meaning: "Cassod Port") is a district of Eastern Shan State in far eastern Myanmar. It consists of two townships.

The main town of Tachileik borders with the northernmost town of Mai Sae in the Chiang Rai province of Thailand. Tachileik and Mai Sae have immigration processing and border crossing checkpoints at both ends of the bridge that connects the two border towns.

== Townships ==
Townships of Tachileik district Tachileik Monghpayak

The district contains the following townships:

- Tachileik Township
- Mong Hpayak Township (formerly part of Mong Hpayak District)

Prior to 2022, the district also included Mong Yawng Township, which it had received from the former Mong Hpayak District. In April 2022, Mong Yawng Township was promoted to the new Mong Yawng District.
