= Mong Hpayak District =

District of Shan State, Myanmar

Coordinates: 20°55′N 99°48′E

Monghpyak District (also Mong Hpyak or Mongphyat) is a district of the Shan State in Myanmar. It consists of 2 townships and 554 villages.

== Townships ==
The district contains the following townships:

- Mong Hpayak Township
- Mong Yawng Township
