= Kengtung Township =

Kengtung ကျိုင်းတုံမြို့နယ် Kyaingtong
- Township
- Location in Kengtung district
- Coordinates: 21°17′30″N 99°36′30″E
- Country: Myanmar
- State: Shan State
- District: Kengtung District
- Capital: Kengtung

Area
  - Total: 3,506 km^{2} (1,354 sq mi)

Population (2014)
  - Total: 171,620
  - Density: 48.955/km^{2} (126.79/sq mi)
- Time zone: UTC+6.30 (MMT)

Kengtung Township (Shan: ၸႄႈဝဵင်းၵဵင်းတုင်, Burmese: ကျိုင်းတုံမြို့နယ်; also spelled Kyaingtong, Kengtong, Thai: เมืองเชียงตุง or Mueang Chiang Tung) is a township of Kengtung District in the Shan State of Myanmar. The principal town is Kengtung. It lies almost entirely east of the Salween River and its area is over 12,000 square miles (31,000 km^{2}). It is bounded on the north by the states of Mang Lon, Mong Lem and Keng Hung (Hsip Hsawng Pannh); east by the Mekong River, south by the Siamese Shan States, and west in a general way by the Salween River, though it overlaps it in some places. The state is known to the Chinese as Mhng Khng, and was frequently called by the Burmese the 32 cities of the Gn (HkOn). The classical name of the state is Khemarata or Khemarata Tungkapuri.

== History ==
By the 14th Century Keng Tung was a sovereign state.

The present sawbwa (Thai: เจ้าฟ้า) or "prince" received his patent from the British government on the February 9, 1897. The early history of Keng Tung is very obscure, but Burmese influence seems to have been maintained since the latter half, at any rate, of the 16th century. The Chinese made several attempts to subdue the state, and appear to have taken the capital in 1765–66, but were driven out by the united Shan and Burmese troops. The same fate seems to have attended the first Siamese invasion of 1804. The second and third Siamese invasions, in 1852 and 1854, resulted in great disaster to the invaders, though the capital was invested for a time.

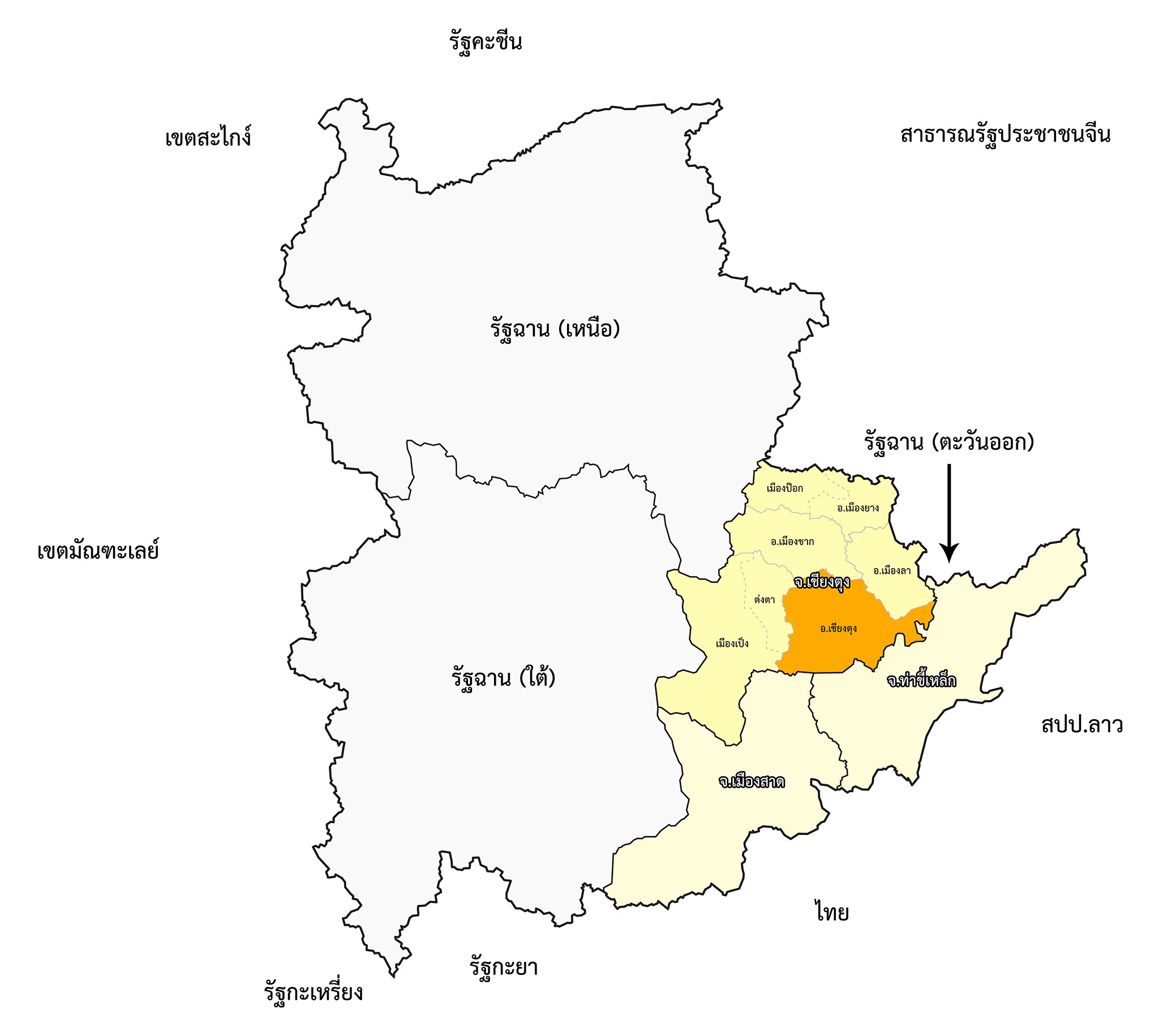
Geography of the district prior to 2022

== Demographics ==
The Tai here call themselves Khün (Hkün); their speech contains many variations from western Shan, and their script is a version of the Lanna script.

Most of the Khüns would adopt Thai names and in the wats (temples) of Kengtong one would find the monks chanting their daily prayers in a similar manner as in Northern Thailand. Historically Thai rulers have laid a claim to the Kengtung area as Saharat Thai Doem, part of their old country.

The population of the state in 1901 was 190,698. In 1897–98, of the various tribes of Shans, the Hkün and Lü contributed about 36,000 each, the western Shans 32,000, the Lem and Lao Shans about 7000, and the Chinese Shans about 5000. Of the hill tribes, the Kaw or Aka are the most homogeneous with 22,000, but probably the Wa (or Vu), disguised under various tribal names, are at least equally numerous. Nominal Buddhists make up a total of 133,400, and the remainder are classed as animists. Spirit-worship is, however, very conspicuously prevalent amongst all classes even of the Shans.

== Geography and Climate ==
Kengtung is the largest, most mountainous, most easterly, and culturally the farthest from the Burmese, of all the Shan States. Geography makes approach to it from the rest of Myanmar difficult for it lies not only beyond the Salween across which no bridge has been built and whose eastern tributaries have cut no easy routes through the serried north–south ridges of the Daen Lao Range, but nearer again to the Mekong than to the Salween.

About 63% of the area lies in the basin of the Mekong River and 37% in the Salween drainage area. The watershed is a high and generally continuous range. Some of its peaks rise to over 7,000 ft (2,100 m)., and the elevation is nowhere much below 5,000 ft (1,500 m). Parallel to this successive hill ranges run north and south with mountainous country predominating.

The chief rivers, tributaries of the Salween, are the Nam Hka, the Hwe Long, Nam Pu, and the Nam Hsim, the first and last being of considerable size. The Nam Hka rises in the Wa States, the Nam Hsim on the watershed range in the centre of the state. Rocks and rapids make both unnavigable, but much timber goes down the Nam Hsim. The lower part of both rivers forms the boundary of Keng Tiling state.

The chief tributaries of the Mekong are the Nam Nga, the Nam Lwe, the Nam Yawng, Nam Lin, Nam Hok and Nam Kok. Of these the chief is the Nam Lwe, which is navigable in the interior of the state, but enters the Mekong by a gorge broken up by rocks. The Nam Lin and the Nam Kok are also considerable streams. The lower course of the latter passes by Chiang Rai in Siamese territory. The lower Nam Ruak or Maenam Ruak forms the boundary with Siam.

Kengtung, the capital, is situated towards the southern end of a valley about 12 miles (19 km) long and with an average breadth of 7 miles (11 km). The town is surrounded by a brick wall and moat about 5 miles (8.0 km) round. Only the central and northern portions are much built over. In the dry season crowds attend the market held according to Shan custom every five days, and numerous caravans come from China. The plain in which the capital stands has an altitude of 3,000 ft (910 m).

=== Climate ===
The rainfall probably averages between 50 and 60 inches (1.5 m) for the year. The temperature seems to rise to nearly 38 °C (100 °F) during hot weather, falling to 21 °C (70 °F) or less during the night. In cold weather a temperature of 4 °C (40 °F) or a few degrees more or less appears to be the lowest experienced.

== Economics ==
The existence of minerals was reported by the sawbwa, or chief, to Francis Garnier in 1867, but none is worked or located. Gold is washed in most of the streams. Teak forests exist in Mong Pu and Mong Hsat, and the sawbwa works them as government contracts. One-third of the price realized from the sale of the logs at Moulmein is retained as the government royalty. There are teak forests also in the Mekong drainage area in the south of the state, but there is only a local market for the timber. Rice, as elsewhere in the Shan States, is the chief crop. Next to it is sugarcane, grown both as a field crop and in gardens. Eai-th-nuts and, tobacco are the only other field crops in the valleys. On the hills, besides rice, cotton, poppy and tea are the chief crops. The tea is carelessly grown, badly prepared, and only consumed locally. A great deal of garden produce is raised in the valleys, especially near the capital. The state is rich in cattle, and exports them to the country west of the Salween. Cotton and opium are exported in large quantities, the former entirely to China, a good deal of the latter to northern Thailand, which also takes shoes and sandals. Tea is carried through westwards from Keng Hung, and silk from the Siamese Shan States. Cotton and silk weaving are dying out as industries. Large quantities of shoes and sandals are made of buffalo and bullock hide, with Chinese felt uppers. There is a good deal of pottery work. The chief work in iron is the manufacture of guns, which has been carried on for many years in certain villages of the Sam Tao district.
