= Wa country =

Wa country may refer to:

- Wa States, the country of the Wa people
- Wa (Japan), the oldest recorded name of Japan
