= Koshanpye =

Burmese language historical name

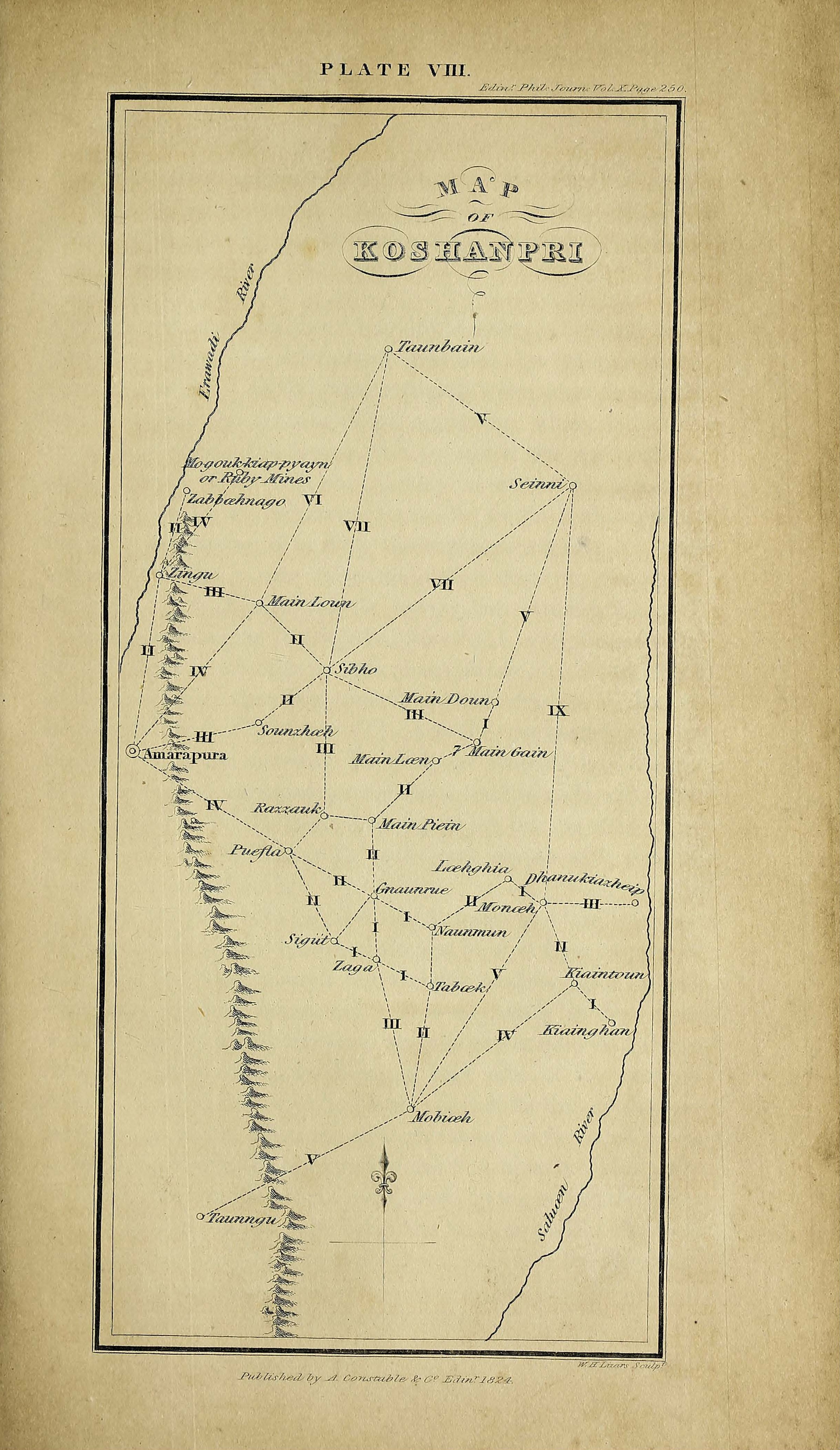
Map of Koshanpri in Edinburgh Philosophical Journal, X, 1824

Koshanpye or Koshanpri (Burmese: ကိုးရှမ်းပြည်, Mandarin Chinese: 憍赏弥, Pali: Kosambhī )also called Kopyidaung (Burmese: ကိုးပြည်ထောင်, Mandarin Chinese: 九卑當), is a historical name in Burmese literature which means "nine Shan states". The name was first introduced to western readers by Francis Buchanan-Hamilton in the Edinburgh Philosophical Journal, X, year of 1824.

== Discovery and explanation ==
Francis Buchanan-Hamilton obtained the Map of Koshanpri from the slave in Ava. Hamilton didn't research the proper name of "Koshanpri" or the literal meaning "Nine Provinces of Shan", but he pointed out that the Shan territory had been divided into 18 lordships, the slave even alleged that this number had been increased to 22. After that, many scholars have given conflicting lists of "nine Shan states" strove to explain the name.

Different version of nine Shan states			Common used name nowaday			
Burney	Hannay	Harvey	English	Chinese	Tai Nuea	Refer to
Maingmo			Manmaw	八莫（蛮莫）	ᥛᥫᥒᥰ ᥛᥨᥝᥱ	Bhamo
Tsi-guen		Sigwin	Hsenwi	兴威（木邦）	ᥔᥦᥢᥲ ᥝᥤᥴ	Theinni
Ho-tha	Hotha	Hotha	Husa	户撒		Husa Township
La-tha	Latha	Latha	Lasa	腊撒		Part of Husa Township
Mo-na	Moongla	Mona	Ganya	盈江（干崖）	ᥛᥫᥒᥰ ᥘᥣᥲ / ᥛᥫᥒᥰ ᥢᥣᥲ	Yingjiang County
Tsan-da	Santa	Santa	Zhanda	盏达	ᥓᥣᥢᥰ ᥖᥣ	Part of Yingjiang
Mo-wun	Moongwoon	Mowun	Longchuan	陇川	ᥛᥫᥒᥰ ᥝᥢᥰ	Longchuan County
Kaing-mah		Kaingma	Gengma	耿马	ᥛᥫᥒᥰ ᥐᥪᥒ	Gengma County
Maing-Lyin / Maing-Lyi		Mainglyin	Mong Lem	孟连	ᥛᥫᥒᥰ ᥘᥥᥛᥰ	Menglian County
	Moongmau	Maingmaw	Mengmao	瑞丽（勐卯）	ᥛᥫᥒᥰ ᥛᥣᥝᥰ	Ruili city
	Sanla		?	?	?	
	Moongsie		Kunming	昆明	ᥛᥫᥒᥰ ᥔᥥᥴ	Kunming city
	Moongtie		Nandian	梁河（南甸）	ᥛᥫᥒᥰ ᥖᥤᥰ	Lianghe County

Some of the scholars don't agree with the literal meaning of "nine Shan states". James George Scott believe "Koshanpye" was a corrupted form of "Kaushambi" (Pali: Kosambī) because Mong Mao and Hsenwi use the name "Kosambī" as their classical buddhist name. The Burman official did not admit that a Shan kingdom had any right to a classical name. But the Shan scholar Sao Saimong opposes this opinion; he states that Koshanpyi could never be mistaken for Kosambī, Burman central court respected Shan states using their own classical name, and Koshanpyi is specifically referred to Chinese Shan states.
