= Nuofu Township =

Nuofu Township 糯福乡
- Township
- Location in Yunnan.
- Coordinates: 22°13′18″N 99°42′09″E
- Country: People's Republic of China
- Province: Yunnan
- Prefecture-level city: Pu'er City
- Autonomous county: Lancang Lahu Autonomous County
- Incorporated (township): 1940

Area
  - Total: 879.67 km^{2} (339.64 sq mi)

Population (2017)
  - Total: 17,556
  - Density: 19.957/km^{2} (51.690/sq mi)
- Time zone: UTC+08:00 (China Standard)
- Postal code: 665808
- Area code: 0879

Nuofu Township (simplified Chinese: 糯福乡; traditional Chinese: 糯福鄉; pinyin: Nuòfú Xiāng) is a township in Lancang Lahu Autonomous County, Yunnan, China. As of the 2017 census it had a population of 17,556 and an area of 879.67-square-kilometre (339.64 sq mi).

== Administrative division ==
As of 2016, the township is divided into nine villages:

- Nuofu (糯福村)
- Gede (戈的村)
- Amuga (阿木戛村)
- Dongmengsong (东勐宋村)
- Bakanai (坝卡乃村)
- Luomeng (洛勐村)
- Nanduan (南段村)
- Wanka (宛卡村)
- Ali (阿里村)

== History ==
In the Qing dynasty (1644–1911), it came under the jurisdiction of Menglian Xuanfusi (孟连宣抚司).

In 1940, it belonged to the 2nd District. That same year, the 2nd District was revoked. The Menghai Township (勐海乡) and Zhenbian Township (镇边乡) were set up.

After the founding of the Communist State in 1949, Zhenbian District (镇边区) was set up. It was renamed "Nuofu District" (糯福区) in 1954. During the Great Leap Forward, its name was changed to "Qianwei Commune" (前卫公社) in 1969 and then "Nuofu Commune" in 1971 (糯福公社). It was incorporated as a township in 1988.

== Geography ==
It lies at the southern of Lancang Lahu Autonomous County, bordering Menglian Dai, Lahu and Va Autonomous County to the west, Myanmar to the south, Donghui Town and Jiujing Hani Ethnic Township to the north, and Huimin Town to the east.

The highest point in the township is the South Duanhou Mountain (南段后山) which stands 2,150 metres (7,050 ft) above sea level. The lowest point is the Nanlang River (南浪河) in the village of Luomeng, which, at 720 metres (2,360 ft) above sea level.

The major rivers and streams are Nanla River (南腊河), Nanli River (南里河), and Nanmen River (南门河).

== Economy ==
The principal industries in the area are agriculture, forestry and animal husbandry. Commercial crops include tea, natural rubber, sugarcane, coffee bean, and fruit.

== Demographics ==
Population census
Year	Pop.	±%
2004	16,332	—
2017	17,556	+7.5%

As of 2017, the National Bureau of Statistics of China estimates the township's population now to be 17,556.

Ethnic groups in 2004
Ethnicity	Population	Percentage
Hani	2077	12.7%
Lahu	11945	73.1%
Han	1066	6.5%
Wa	647	4.1%
Dai	441	2.7%
Other	129	0.8%

== Tourist attractions ==
The Nuofu Christian Church (糯福基督教堂) is a church in the township. It has been listed among the third group of provincial level cultural heritage by Yunnan government in 1987.
