= National Democratic Youth League of Wa State =

National Democratic Youth League of Wa State 佤邦民族民主青年团
- Secretary General: Zhao Ainalai
- National affiliation: United Wa State Party

The National Democratic Youth League of Wa State (Chinese: 佤邦民族民主青年团) is the youth wing of the United Wa State Party (UWSP), the ruling party of the de facto independent Wa State in Shan State, Myanmar. The organisation imitates the structure of the Communist Youth League of China.

== History ==
Members of its first working committee were elected on 7 December 2015. Its first work committee meeting was held in the capital city of Wa State, Pangkham, on 13 March 2016. Its general secretary is Zhao Ainalai.
