= Wei Hsueh-kang =

Chinese-born fugitive (born 1945)

- 魏學剛
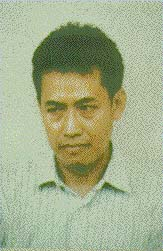
- Wei's wanted photo on the US Department of State's website
- Born: 1945 (age 80–81); Yunnan, Republic of China
- Citizenship: Thailand (1985–2001)
- Political party: United Wa State Party
- Allegiance: United Wa State Army
- Criminal charges: Drug trafficking charges (unspecified)
- Reward amount: US$2 million
- Wanted by: United States and Thailand
- Wanted since: 1988

Wei Hsueh-kang, (Note: traditional Chinese: 魏學剛; simplified Chinese: 魏学刚; pinyin: Wèi Xuégāng; Wade–Giles: Wei Hsüeh-kang; Thai: ไท่เซิง แซ่เว่ย, RTGS: Thaisoeng Sae-woei) also known by various other names, is a Chinese-born fugitive wanted by the United States and Thailand for trafficking drugs in New York and Southeast Asia's Golden Triangle. After eluding the Thai authorities in 1988, he started several business ventures with the wealth he had accumulated from his crimes. He has since become a major business tycoon in neighbouring Myanmar. He is also a regional commander of the United Wa State Army, the armed forces of the self-governing Wa State of Myanmar.

== Pseudonyms ==
During his career as a drug trafficker, Wei adopted several pseudonyms to evade capture by authorities. His pseudonyms include U Sein Win, (Note: Burmese: ဦးစိန်ဝင်း, romanized: U Sein Win; traditional Chinese: 吳興文; simplified Chinese: 吴兴文; pinyin: Wú Xìngwén) Prasit Cheewinnitipanya, (Note: Thai: ประสิทธิ์ ชีวินนิติปัญญา, RTGS: Prasit Chiwinnitipanya) Charnchai Cheevinnitipanya, (Note: Thai: ชาญชัย ชีวินนิติปัญญา, RTGS: Chanchai Chiwinnitipanya) and Suchat Phanloetkun, (Note: Thai: สุชาติ พันธุ์เลิศกุล) among others.

== Early life ==
According to his Thai documents, Wei Hsueh-kang was born in 1945 in Yunnan, China. However, the United States Department of State gives Wei's date of birth as 29 May 1952.

After the Communist victory in the Chinese Civil War in 1949, Wei fled from mainland China to Burma (present-day Myanmar) with his father, who was then a member of the Kuomintang supported by the CIA. Wei helped his father sell opium, in part to fund the Kuomintang's insurgency in mainland China, until his graduation from high school, upon which he joined a militia led by the drug lord Khun Sa.

== Career ==
=== As an insurgent ===
Wei followed the leadership of Khun Sa for two decades, first as a member of Khun Sa's personal militia and then as a member of the Mong Tai Army (MTA). After falling out of favour with Khun Sa in the mid-1980s, Wei left the MTA and began to work with the Wa military leader Bao Youxiang. Wei and Bao were among the founders of the United Wa State Party (UWSP) in 1989, the latter eventually becoming its leader. Bao subsequently made Wei a regional commander of the party's armed wing, the United Wa State Army (UWSA).

=== As a drug trafficker ===
Wei is believed to have remained closely associated with Khun Sa even after he left the MTA, especially during the height of opium production in the Golden Triangle. He is wanted by the United States' Bureau of International Narcotics and Law Enforcement Affairs for drug offences committed in New York; there is a US$2 million reward for information leading to his capture and arrest. Wei is currently believed to be residing in China and along the Myanmar border.

Although Wei was granted Thai citizenship in 1985, three years later in 1988 he was facing a sentence of life imprisonment by the Thai government. He jumped bail, however, and his Thai citizenship was later revoked in 2001.

Wei has since downsized his involvement in drug trafficking, partly in response to his wanted status by the United States.

=== As a business tycoon ===
In 1998, Wei founded the Hong Pang Group with the money he had amassed from his time as a drug trafficker, as well as money he had gained by taking advantage of the privileges offered in the ceasefire deal by General Khin Nyunt. The Hong Pang Group owns and controls a multitude of businesses in agriculture, commerce, construction, distilleries, electronics and communications, mining, and petroleum. The Hong Pang Group is based in Pangkham and has regional offices in Yangon, Mandalay, Lashio, Tachilek, and Mawlamyine.

The group was renamed Thawda Win Co. Ltd in 2012, and it remains involved in several projects in Myanmar, including the Meiktila-Taunggyi-Tachilek road. The company's income also supported the UWSA's operations with truckloads of military hardware and ammunition from China, through Wei's close relationship with Zhou Yongkang.

A fire in Pangkham on 18 April 2009 destroyed the largest petrol station in the city and over 10,000 tons of teak in a warehouse; both buildings belonged to Wei.

Following the 2015 jade mine disaster in Hpakant, Kachin State, the London-based NGO Global Witness accused Wei of exploiting locals and illegally funding mining operations in the area. This claim however, could not be verified or denied by Wei himself, as he was still in hiding.
