= Mang Lön =

Former Shan State in Burma

- Princely State of the Shan States
- 1814–1959
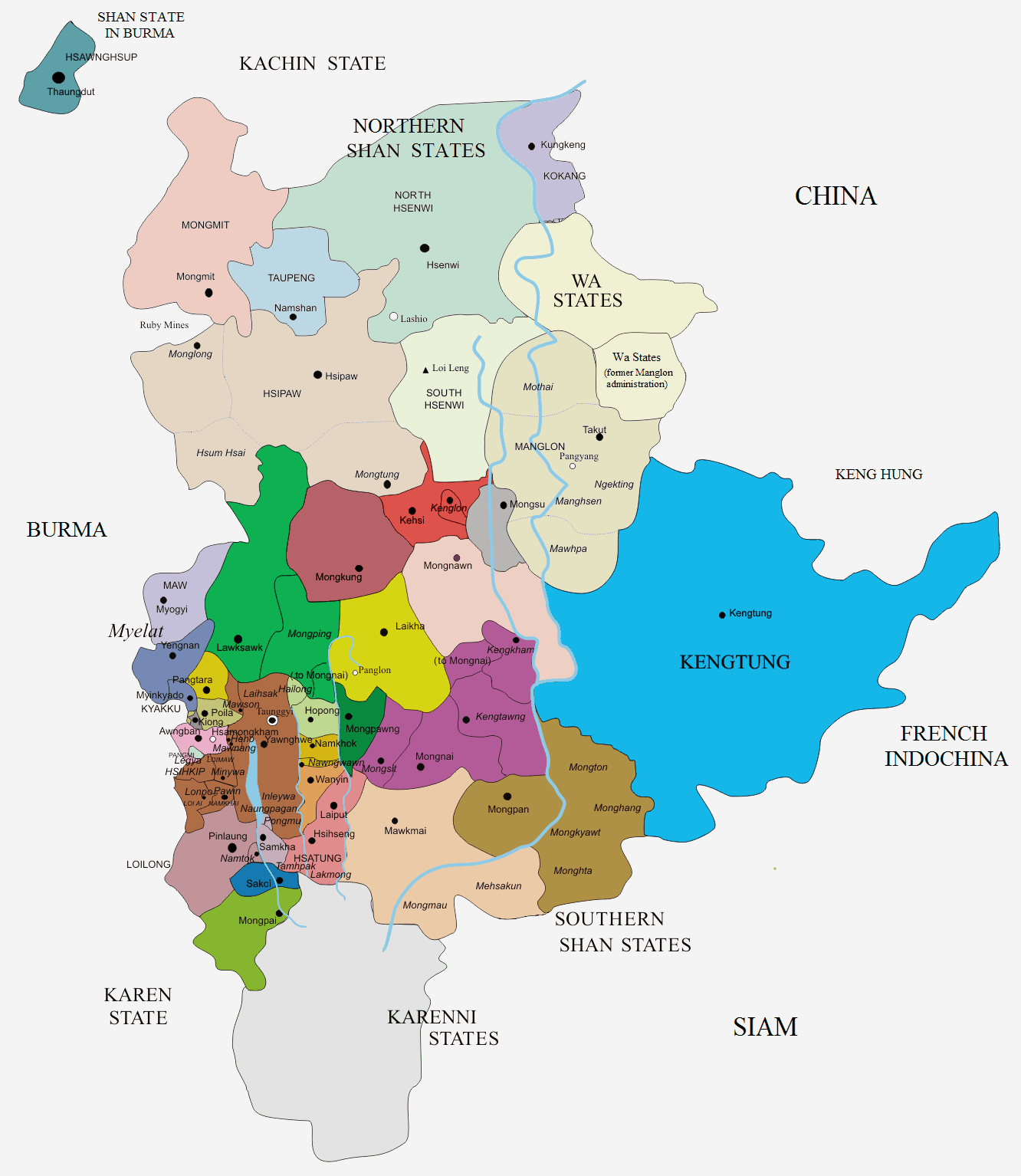
- Mang Lön and the Wa States in a map of the Shan States
- Area
  - 1911: 7,700 km^{2} (3,000 sq mi)
- Population
  - 1911: 40,000
- Historical era: British Raj
  - Mang Lön becomes tributary to Hsenwi State: 1814
  - Abdication of the last Saopha: 1959
Preceded by	Succeeded by
Hsenwi State	Shan State

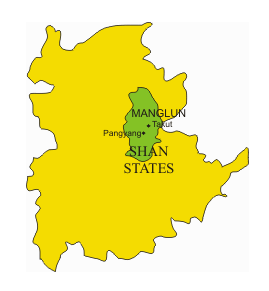
Location of Mang Lön in the Shan States

Mang Lön or Mang Lün was a Shan-Wa state in what is now Myanmar (Burma). It is a mountainous territory, including the valleys of the Salween and its tributary the Nam Hka. It had an approximate area of 7770 km^{2} and its estimated population in 1911 was 40,000.

Mang Lön extended from about 21° 30′ to 23° N., or for 100 miles, along the river Salween, which divided the state into East and West Mang Lön. The inhabitants of East Mang Lön were mostly Wa, while the inhabitants of West Mang Lön were mostly Shan.

== History ==
Little is known about the area of Mang Lön before the 19th century. It was likely under the control of Möng Lem until the Qianlong period (1736–1796).

The first Sawbwa (Saopha) of Mang Lön was Ta Ang, a Wa leader who became tributary to Hsenwi State in 1814, retaining his hold over the territory. The eastern part of the state was often raided by Wa chiefs of the neighbouring independent Wa States. The capital, Takut, was located northeast of Pangyang and was perched on a hilltop 6000 feet above sea level. The Sawbwa was a Wa who adopted the style of the Shan rulers. He had control over two substates, Mot Hai to the north and Maw Hpa to the south. The Wa of Mang Lön had given up headhunting, and many professed Buddhism.

Traditionally the adjacent Wa States had been administered by a Sawbwa, a Shan hereditary chief who resided in Mang Lön. In the second half of the 19th century the British authorities in Burma judged the Wa territory remote and of difficult access and, excepting Mang Lön, they left the Wa States without administration, its border with China undefined. That situation suited the Wa well, for throughout their history they had consistently preferred being left alone.

There were few Wa in West Mang Lön, where Shans formed the chief population, but there were Palaungs, Chinese and Yanglam, besides Lahu. The bulk of the population in East Mang Lon was Wa, but there were Shans in the valley areas. Both portions were very hilly; the only flat land being along the banks of streams in the valleys, and here the Shans were settled. There were prosperous settlements and bazaars at Nawng Hkam and Mong Kao in West Mang Lön.

=== Rulers ===
The rulers of Mang Lön bore the title of Saopha. Between 1870 and 1892 the state was divided into East and West Mang Lön.

==== Saophas ====
- 1814 – 1822 Hsö Hkam (Ta Awng) (d. 1822)
- 1822 – 1852 Sao Hkun Sang (Khun Sing) (d. 1852)
- 1852 – 1853 Uyaraza (Upayaza) (d. 1854)
- 1853 – 1860 Naw Hpa (Nawpha) (d. 1860)
- 1860 – 1919 Sao Tön Hsang (Tun Sang) (b. 1831 – d. 1919) (1870–1892, in East Manglön)
- 1870 – 1877 Hsang Kyaw (in West Manglön)
- 1877 – 1892 Sao Maha (in West Manglön)
- 1919 – 1952 Sao Man Laik
- 1919 – 1946 Sao Hka Nan -Regent (b. 1892 – d. 1946)

== See also ==
- Wa people
- Wa State
