= Pangkham =

Town in Shan State, Myanmar

Pangkham Pang Kham • ဝဵင်းပၢင်သၢင်း • 邦康 Panghsang
- Location in Myanmar
- Coordinates: 22°10′N 99°11′E
- Country: Myanmar
- Division: Wa State (de facto); Shan State (de jure)
- Self-Administered Division (de jure): Wa Self-Administered Division (de jure)
- Special Township (de facto) Township (de jure): Bangkum Special Township (de facto); Pangsang Township (de jure)

Population (2002)
  - Total: 15,000
  - Ethnicities: Wa Shan Han Chinese
- Time zone: UTC+6.30 (MMT)

Pangkham (Burmese: ပန်ခမ်းမြို့, MLCTS: pan kham: mrui.; Chinese: 邦康; pinyin: Bāngkāng; Parauk: Pang Kham), known before 1999 as Panghsang (Parauk: Pang Sang, Chinese: 邦桑; pinyin: Bāngsāng; Wade–Giles: Pang^{1}-sang^{1}), is a border town in Myanmar's far eastern Shan State. It is situated at a bend on the Hka River near the border with Yunnan Province, China, opposite of the town of Menglian. Pangkham is the main town of Pangsang Township of Matman District of Shan State.

It has hotels, shops, a supermarket, karaoke bars, a bowling alley, and a 24-hour casino. There is a thriving night life centered on the casino. Food in Pangkham is mostly imported from China. The cars, mainly Land Rovers, Land Cruisers and foreign pick-ups, have been smuggled in from Thailand.

== History ==
Pangkham is the de facto capital of Wa State, officially designated the Wa Self-Administered Division, while Hopang is its capital assigned by Myanmar government. It is controlled by the United Wa State Army (UWSA), the military wing of the United Wa State Party (UWSP) formed after the collapse of the Communist Party of Burma (CPB) in 1989.

In the 1990s the Wa Women's Association established an orphanage in Pangkham for children's whose parents were killed in fighting between United Wa State Army and Shan forces.

On 17 April 2009, the 20th anniversary of the coup against the CPB was celebrated in Pangkham, attended by representatives from the military government, Kokang, Kachin Independence Organisation (KIO), Shan State Army - North, and former members of the CPB.

The next day, on 18 April 2009, a fire destroyed the largest petrol station and over 10,000 tons of teak in a warehouse in Pangkham, both belonging to one of the Wa leaders Wei Hsueh-kang.

The road from Panghkam to Metman is 48 miles long.
