= United Wa State Party =

- Burmese name: ဝပြည် သွေးစည်း ညီညွတ်ရေး ပါတီ Wa.prany Swe:cany: Nyinywatre: Pati
- Chinese name: 佤邦联合党; Wǎbāng Liánhé Dǎng
- Chairman: Bao Youxiang
- General Secretary: Zhao Ai Nap Lai
- Vice Chairman: Xiao Ming Liang (deceased); U Lau Yaku
- Deputy General Secretary: Bao Ai Kham
- Founder: Zhao Nyi-Lai
- Founded: 3 November 1989; 36 years ago
- Split from: Communist Party of Burma
- Headquarters: Pangkham
- Armed wing: United Wa State Army
- Youth wing: National Democratic Youth League of Wa State
- Ideology: Communism; Marxism-Leninism; Maoism; Wa nationalism; Ethno-nationalism; Militarism
- Political position: Far-left

Party flag

The United Wa State Party (simplified Chinese: 佤邦联合党; traditional Chinese: 佤邦聯合黨; pinyin: Wǎbāng Liánhédǎng; UWSP) is the ruling party of Wa State, an autonomous region in northern Shan State, Myanmar (Burma). It was founded on 3 November 1989 as a merger between the Marxist-Leninist Burma National United Party (BNUP) and several smaller, non-communist Wa groups. Its armed wing is the United Wa State Army (UWSA), and its chairman and commander in chief is Bao Youxiang.

The party enjoys good relations with China, dating to the days of the Communist Party of Burma (CPB), from which it emerged in 1989; its leaders liaise directly with Chinese military intelligence, and have received a steady flow of military and financial assistance from Beijing. Despite this, the organisation has faced mounting pressure from the Chinese Communist Party for their support of various EAO's in Myanmar.

== History ==
From the late 1960s to the late 1980s, ethnic Wa tribesmen had served as the main fighting force of the Communist Party of Burma (CPB) in its insurgency against the Burmese central government. By 1989, there was great tension between the Wa who did the actual fighting and the leadership of the CPB that was largely composed of ethnic Bamar intellectuals. In April 1989, Wa fighters stormed the party's headquarters in Panghsang (present-day Pangkham) and destroyed portraits of communist leaders and copies of communist literature. This was done with the tacit approval and acceptance of the Chinese, who were the main economic backers of the CPB; Beijing wished to get rid of the old Bamar leadership of the CPB, and improve their relations with the new central authorities in Myanmar after the fall of Ne Win. The former Wa members of the CPB then formed the Burma National United Party (BNUP), before agreeing to a merger with several smaller, non-communist Wa groups that were active along the China–Myanmar border, such as the Wa National Council (WNC). The United Wa State Party (UWSP) was subsequently founded on 3 November 1989.

The UWSP's first chairman was Zhao Nyi-Lai. He was a former military leader of the Sao Hin Saopha who joined the CPB in 1969. He was elected as a member of the CPB central committee in 1985.

In 1989-90 the UWSP reached several agreements with the SLORC government, recognizing the government's ultimate authority while in practice maintaining control over a substantial part of northeastern Myanmar, along the border with China.

In 1995, Zhao Nyi-Lai suffered a stroke and Bao Youxiang became the new chairman. Zhao Nyi-Lai remained as General-Secretary of the party until his death in 2009. In 2005, Bao Youxiang's health deteriorated and Bao Youyi, the elder brother of Bao Youxiang, took over the day-to-day activities of the UWSP/UWSA as Deputy General-Secretary. Wei Hsueh-kang was appointed as a Central Committee Member in 1996. He is wanted for narcotic trafficking by the authorities in the United States.

In 2018, Bao Youyi fainted at the third session of the Union Peace Conference in Naypyidaw and was hospitalized. In 2022, he stepped down as Deputy General-Secretary and was succeeded by his nephew Bao Ai Kham, Bao Youxiang's son. In the same 2022 cabinet reshuffle, Zhao Ai Nap Lai, the son of Zhao Nyi-lai, officially became the General Secretary and head of the politburo.

The UWSP currently governs Wa State under a one-party communist system based on "Maoist state-building". Their self-ascribed label of communist is, however, disputed by some sources.

In November 2023, the UWSP declared Wa State a neutral zone in the Myanmar civil war after the Three Brotherhood Alliance conducted Operation 1027 against the Tatmadaw. The UWSA threatened severe retaliation against hypothetical anti-junta or Tatmadaw incursions.

== Notable Members ==
- Bao Youxiang
- Zhao Nyi-Lai
- Wei Hsueh-kang
- Xiao Min Liang
- Lau Yaku
- Zhao Ai Nap Lai
- Bao Ai Kham
- Zhao Guo An (Zhou Guang)
- Chao Ngi Lai
- Bao Youyi
- Bao Youliang (Bao You Liang)
- Li Ziru
- Zhao Zhongdang
- Le Zuliang

== Gallery ==
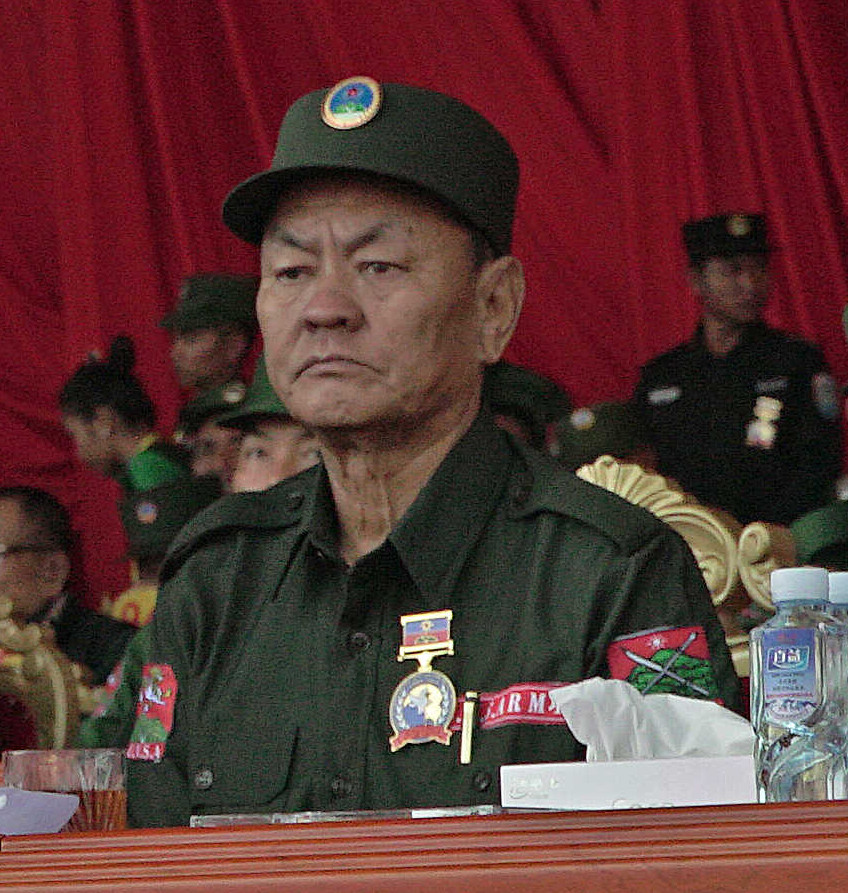
Bao Youxiang, UWSA chief

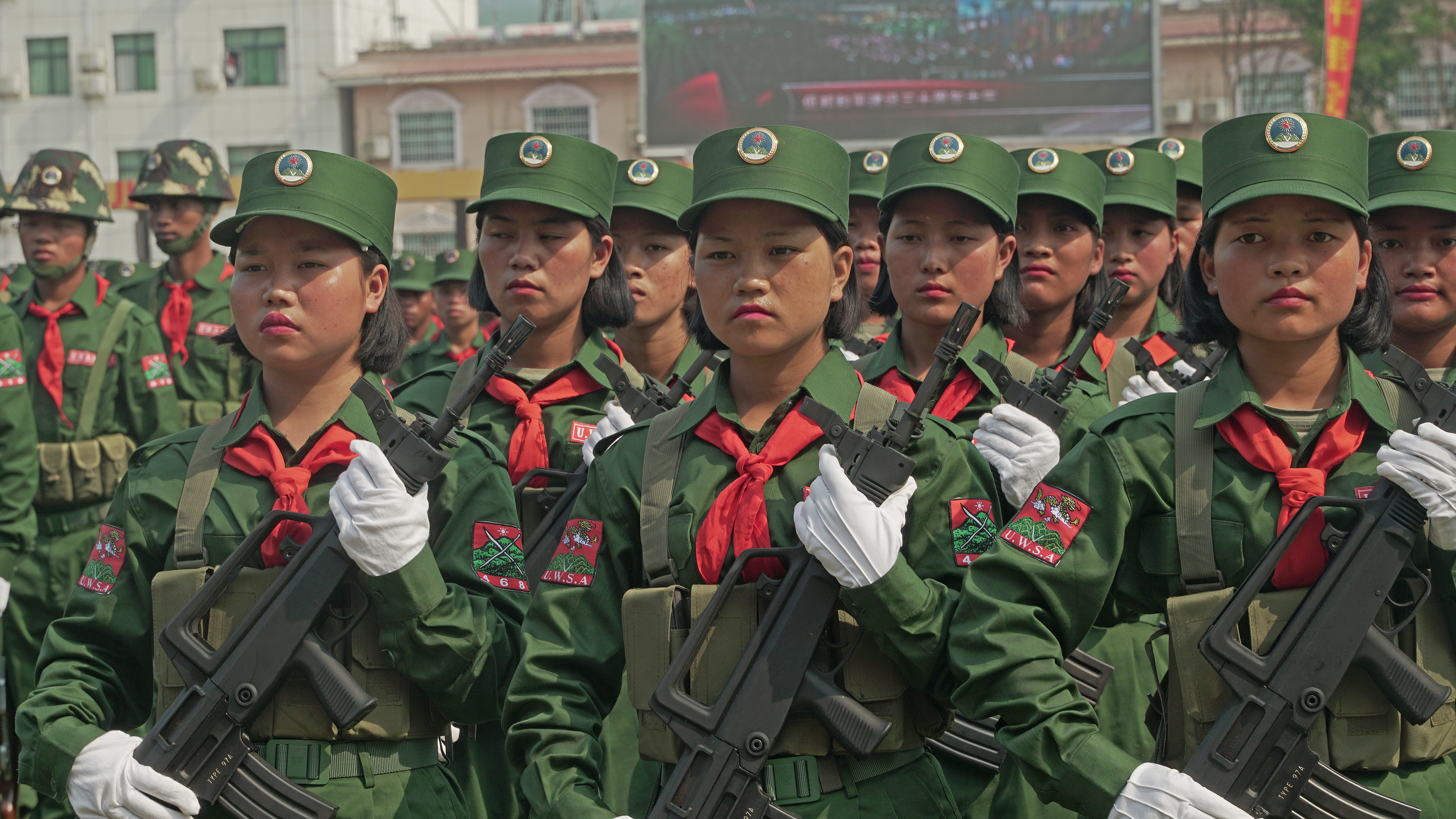
UWSA female soldiers stand at attention during ceremonies

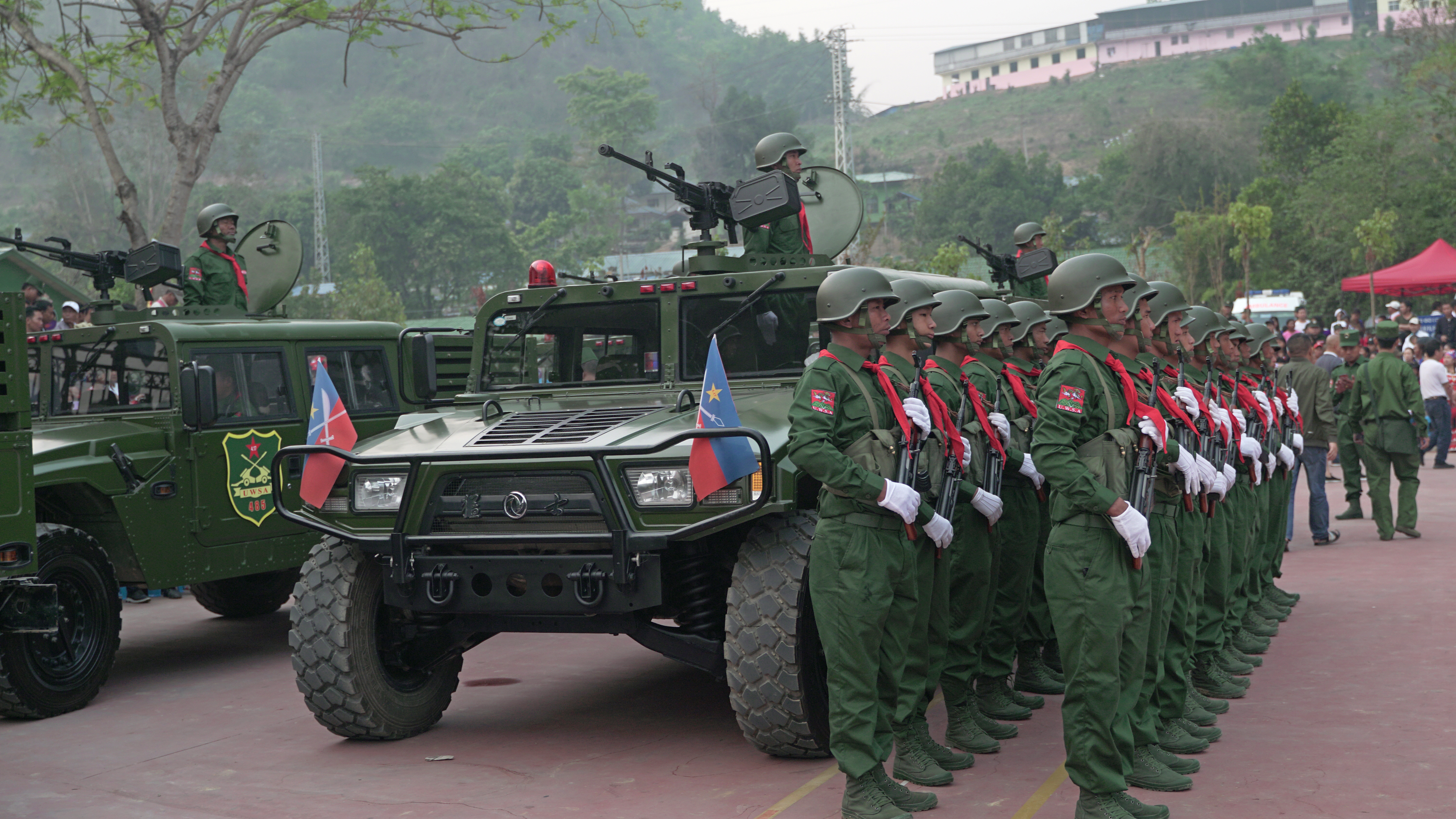
UWSA soldiers stand at attention during ceremonies

== See also ==
- Wa States (historical region)
