= Nam Hka =

River in Myanmar and China

Location
- Country: Myanmar, China

Physical characteristics
- Source
  - location: Wa Hills
  - elevation: 366 m (1,201 ft)
- Mouth
  - location: Salween
  - coordinates: 21.5524°N 98.6245°E
  - elevation: 336 m (1,102 ft)

Hka River or Nam Hka is a river of Shan State, Burma. It is a left hand tributary of the Salween.

Historically this river separated the Wa States and the northern Shan state of Manglon from Kengtung State.

== Course ==
The Nam Hka forms the boundary between Burma and China in its upper course when it flows roughly southwards. It bends westwards at Pangkham, located at the bend of the river, until it joins the left bank of the Salween.

== See also ==
- List of rivers in Burma
