= Wa States =

Historical region of China and Myanmar

Coordinates: 22°30′N 98°45′E

Wa States ဝနယ် / 佤邦 Meung Vax
- Before 500 BC–c. 1950
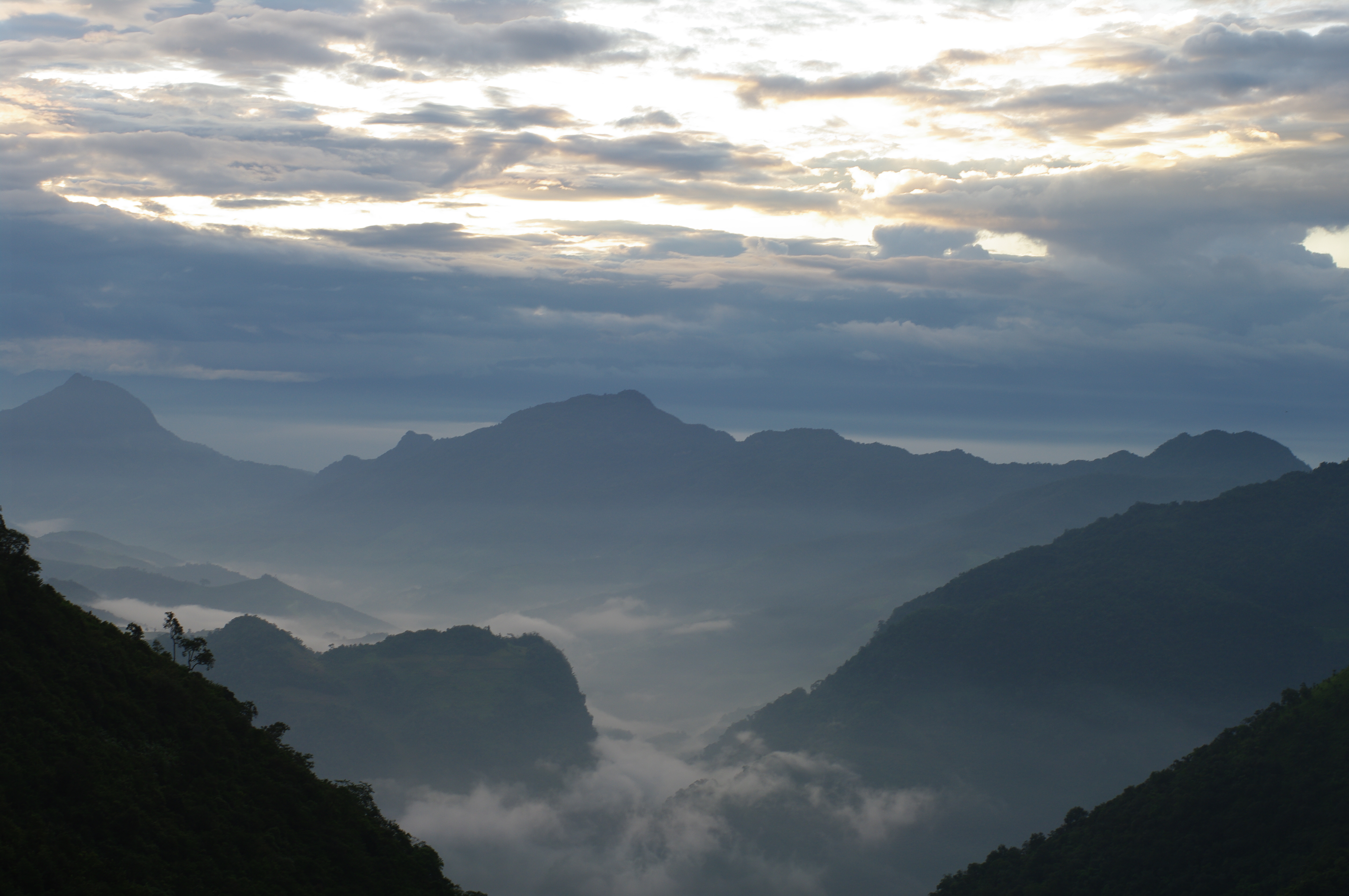
- View of the rugged mountains of the Wa country with the valleys covered in mist.

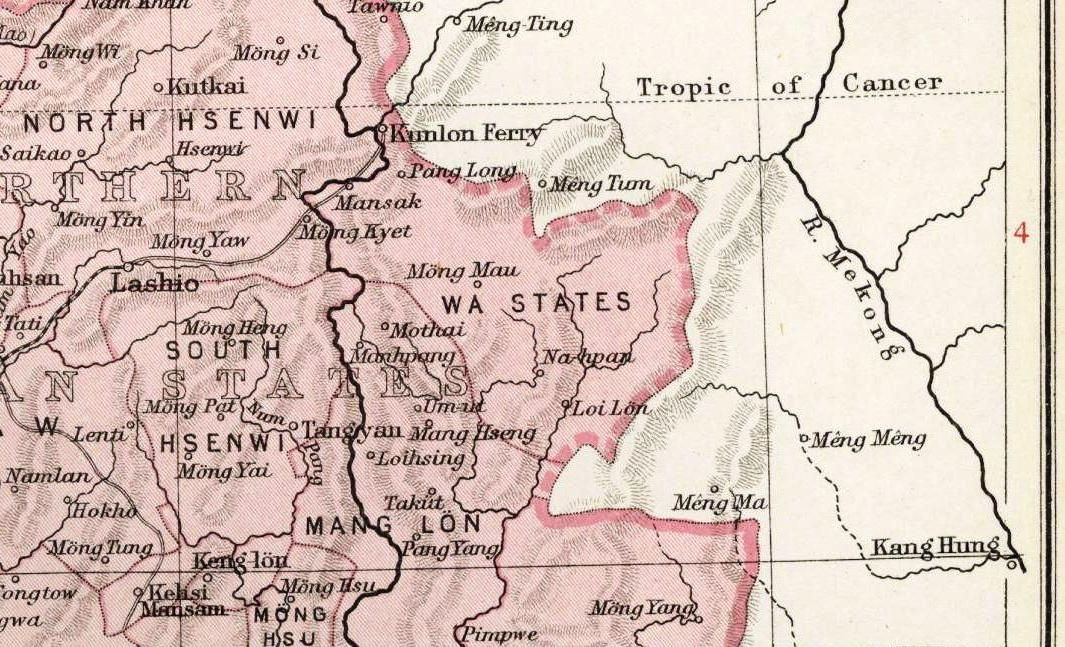
- The Wa States in an Imperial Gazetteer of India map. Note that the border with China is marked with a discontinuous darker pink line, unlike Kengtung State to the south and North Hsenwi to the north.
- Status: Self-governing group of States, then Native States under nominal control of the British Empire
- Government: Petty kingdoms and village fiefdoms
- History
  - Wa ancestral territories: Before 500 BC
  - Incorporation into Shan State (Yunnan Prov. areas annexed by China earlier): c. 1950
Succeeded by
Shan State; Yunnan
- Today part of: China; Myanmar

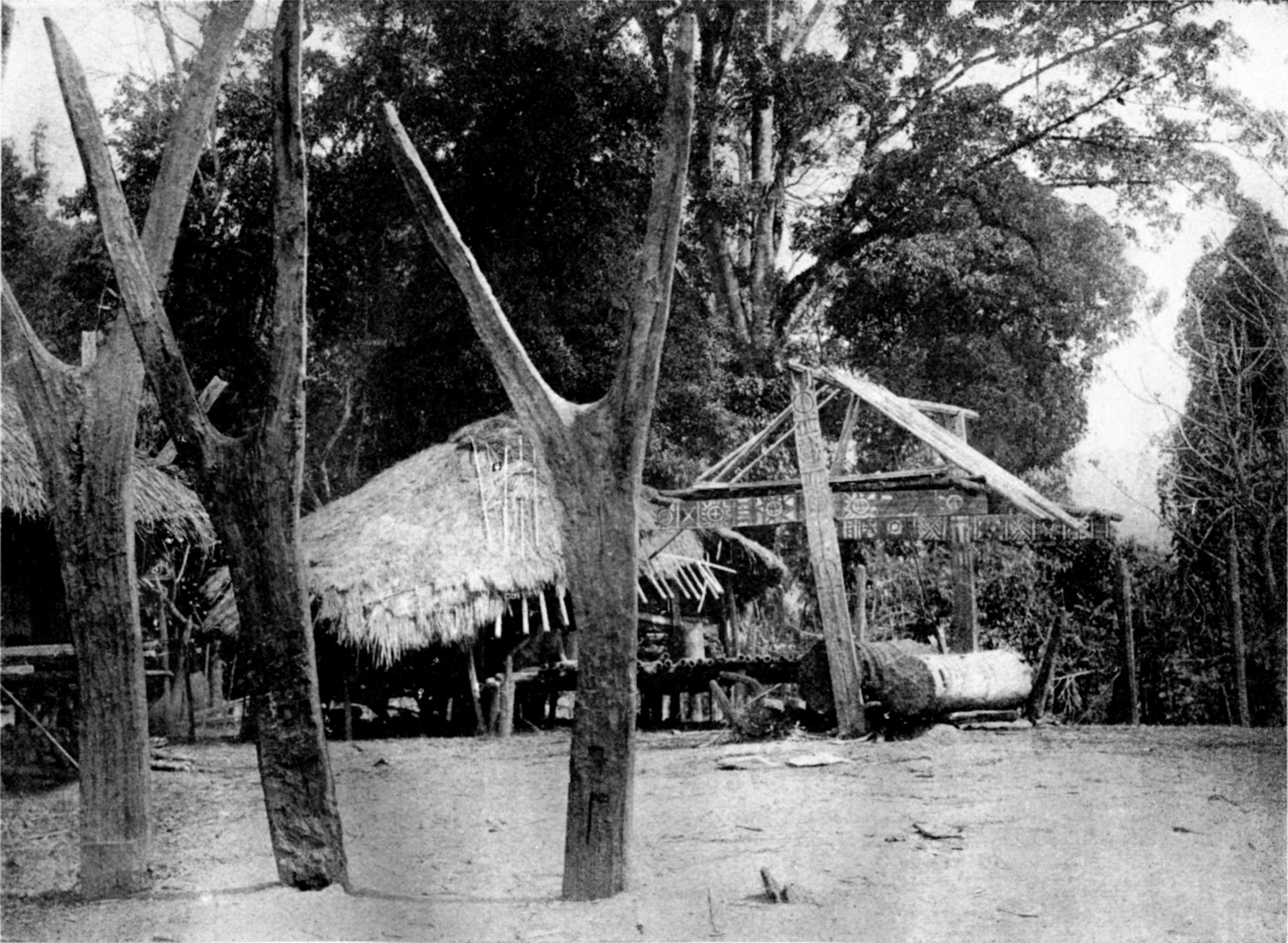
A Wa Khaox Si Gang y-shaped post where the ceremonial sacrifice of a buffalo was performed in special occasions

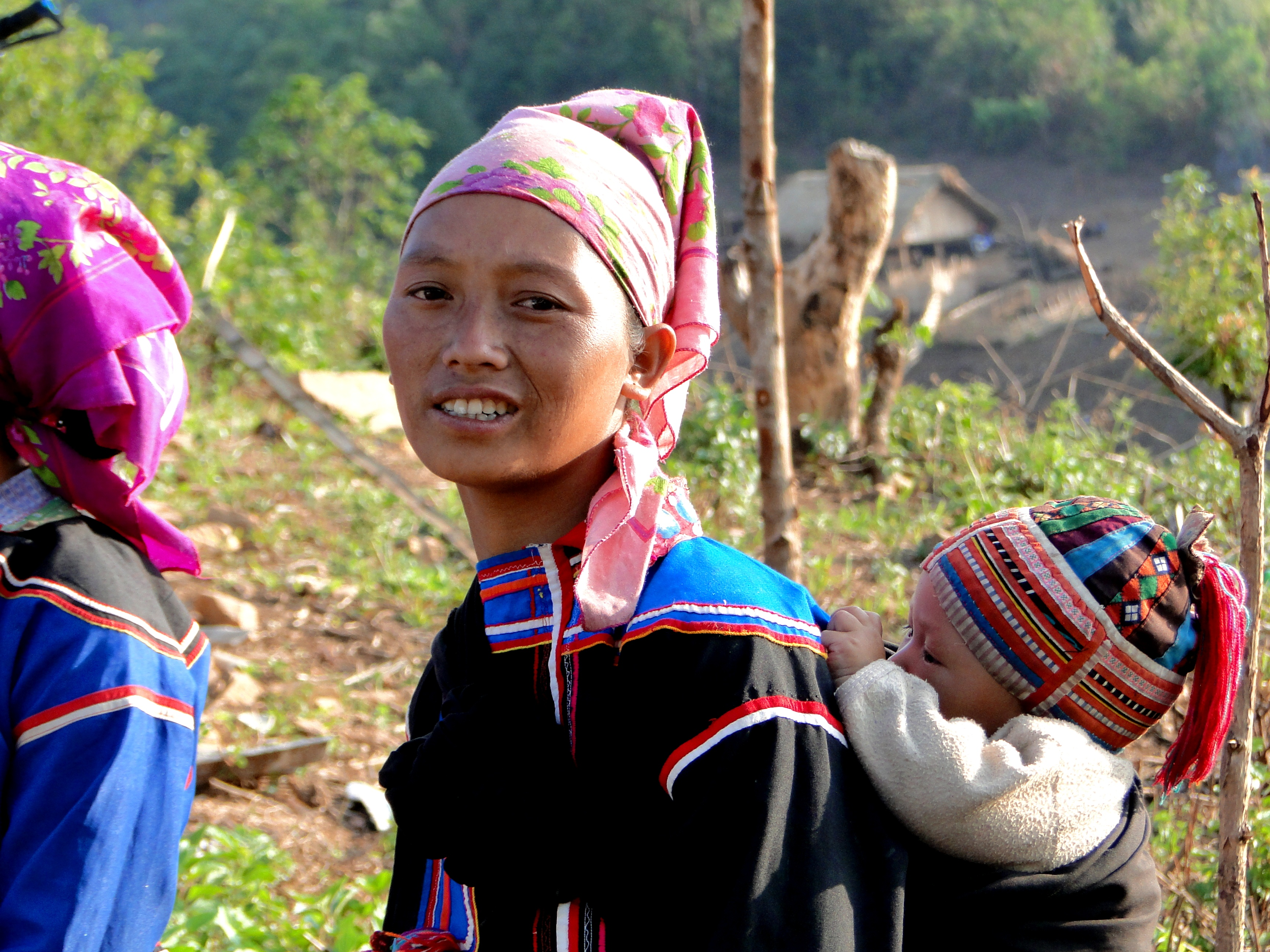
A Wa woman carrying her child

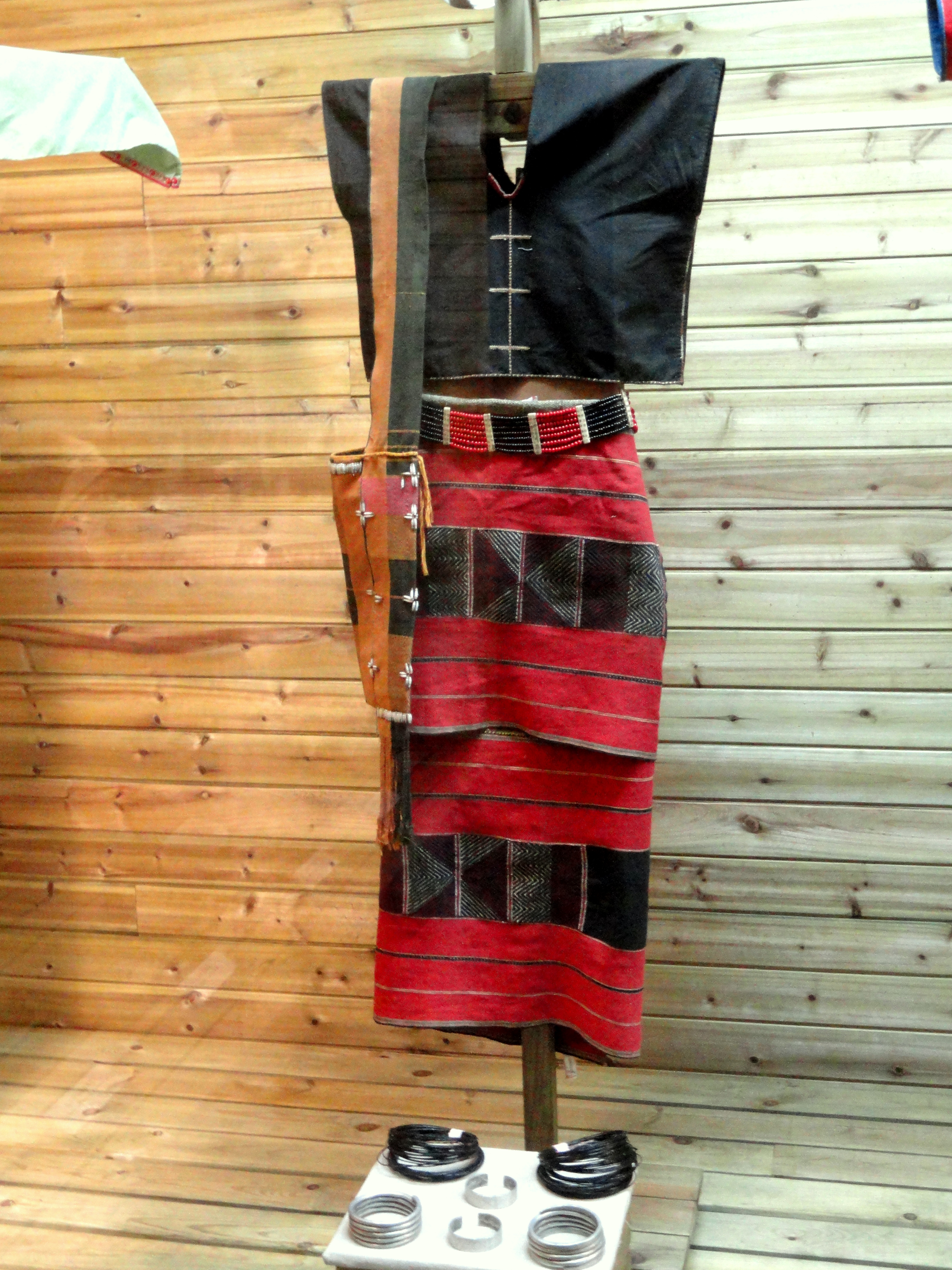
Traditional Wa female dress and bangles. Yunnan Nationalities Museum.

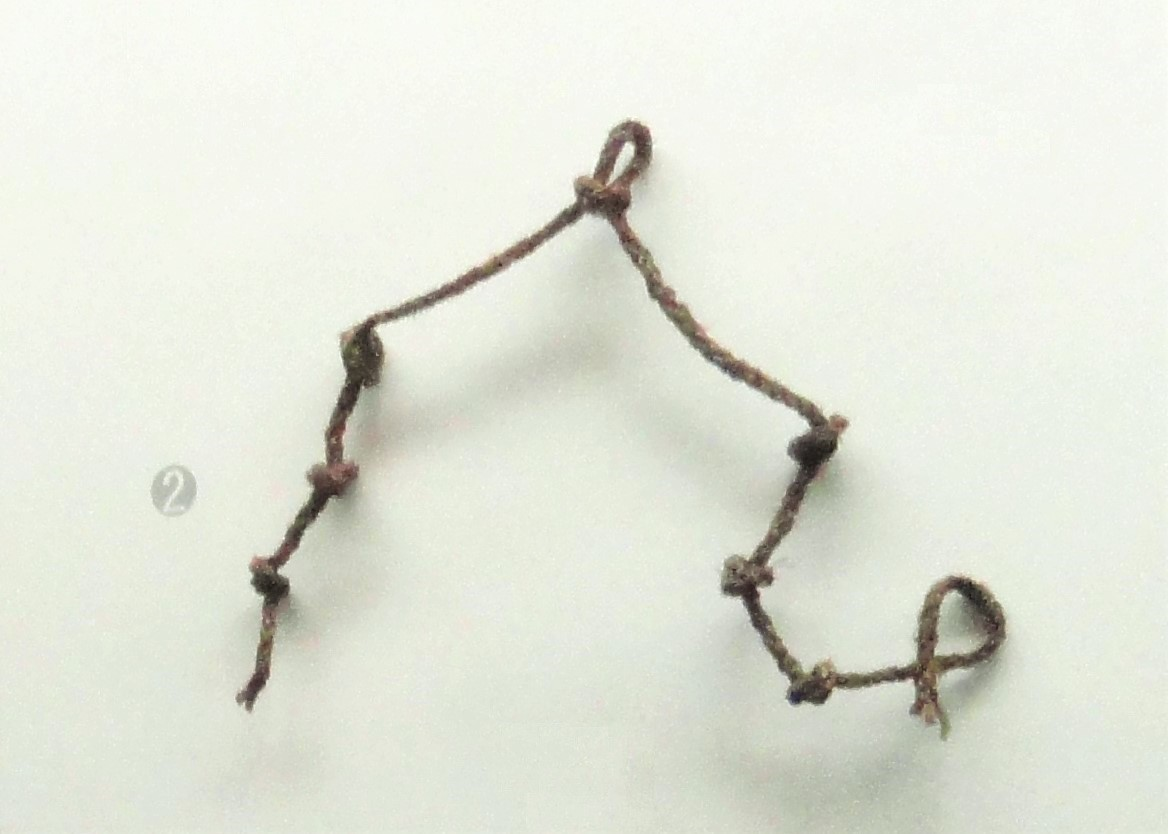
Rope knot writing system of the Wa.

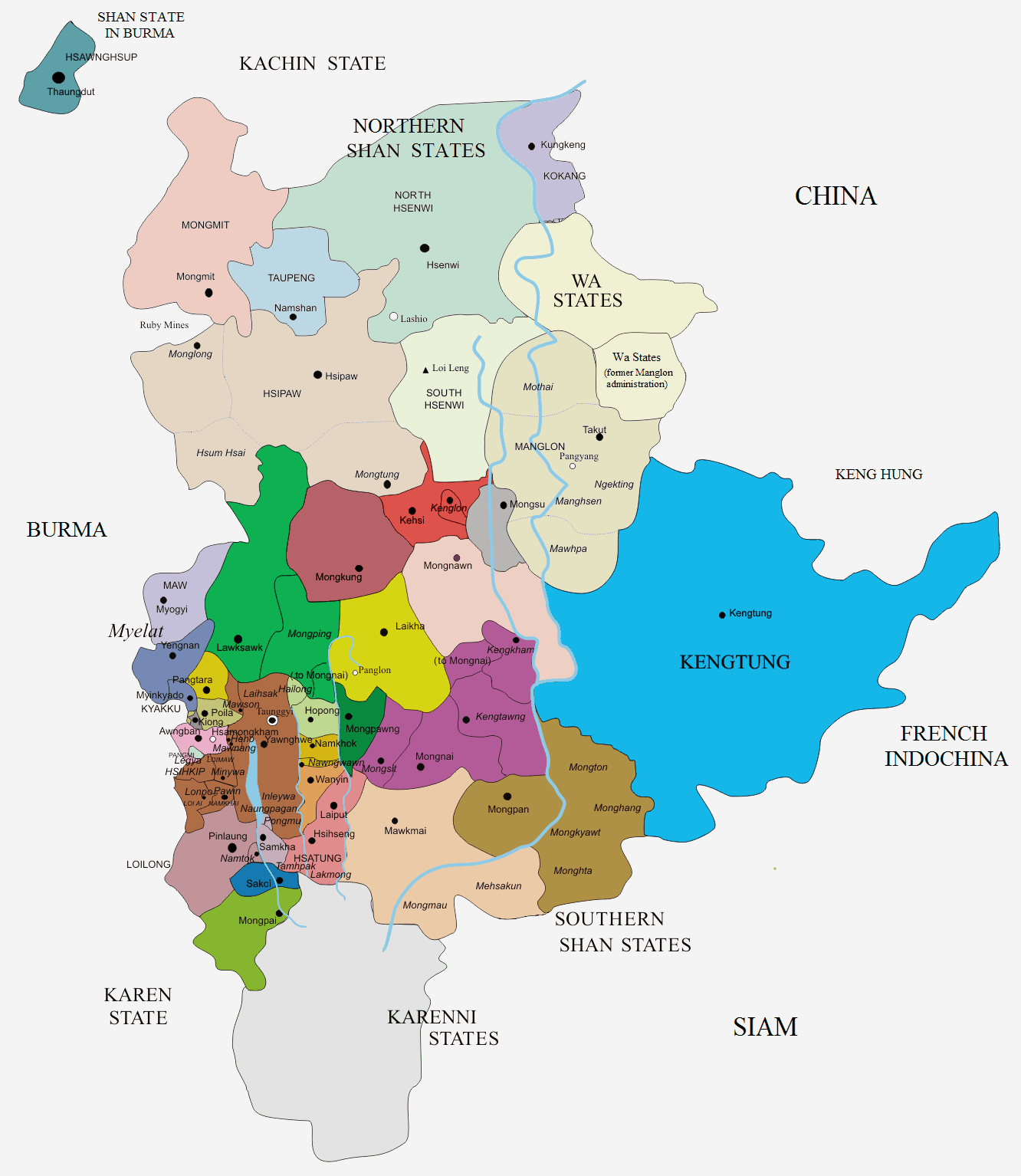
The Wa States and Manglon in a map of the Shan States.

The Wa States was the name formerly given to the Wa Land, the natural and historical region inhabited mainly by the Wa people, an ethnic group speaking an Austroasiatic language. The region is located to the northeast of the Shan States of British Burma, in the area of present-day Shan State of northern Myanmar (Burma) and the western zone of Pu'er Prefecture, Yunnan, China.

Practically the whole Wa region is rugged mountainous territory with steep hills and deep valleys. There were no urban areas. A section of the historical Wa territory was included in the state of Manglon, one of the Shan States. Sir James George Scott visited the Wa States around the turn of the 20th century and wrote about the place, taking pictures of the people and the houses of the area as well. Considered a distant and inaccessible border area by former empires, the British census of 1901 did not include the Wa States, so statistics regarding a population over 50,000 in 1911 are estimates.

The oral tradition of the Wa people claims that their territory had been much larger in the distant past, an assertion that is confirmed both by Shan and Yunnan Chinese sources. The Wa also regard their ancestral territory as being at the centre of the inhabited world. Nowadays part of the area of the former Wa States is included in Wa State, an autonomous polity within Myanmar.

== History ==
=== Ancient lore ===
There are no historical records on the Wa States before the 19th century. Northern Thai legends claim that before the advent of Buddhism the Lanna territory was founded by nine Wa clans. According to Wa oral tradition the area where they live, with the Nam Hka flowing across it, as well as the areas further to the south between the Mekong and the Salween down to Chiang Mai, had been their ancestral territory since time immemorial. This view is supported by remains of fortified towns on the hills now covered by jungle, as well as by the traditions of the Shan, according to which the territory of Kengtung State further to the south had formerly belonged to the Wa people who were displaced around 1229 and were later defeated by King Mangrai.

Around Kengtung there are dispersed groups related to the Wa, such as the Tai Loi, En, Piying and Hsen Hsum, living in small villages, likely remnants of the former Wa population. The Vingngun (Pakkatè, Shan: Wiang Ngoen) historical area of the Wa —where silver was said to have been worked— was included in the Wa States. By the 18th century, during Qing dynasty rule in China, the Wa area became separated from the tribal military control of the Dai people.

=== 19th century ===
In the 19th century the British government considered the region a remote territory and did not administer the Wa States. The only Wa territory administered by the British was the State of Manglon, which was ruled by a Wa saopha and was populated mostly by Wa in the region that lay east of the Salween. The border with China was left undefined and the area was left alone, officially belonging neither to China nor to Great Britain. Consequently, the Wa States were never fully incorporated into British Burma.

The population of the Wa States included other ethnic groups such as the Tai Yai, Lisu and Kachin people. There were also enclaves of Lahu at Mongkha and Lao Shan in Mongshaw within Wa territory.

The inhabitants of the Wa States were traditionally animistic. But by the 19th century a minority of the Wa had been influenced by the Buddhist doctrine of the neighbouring Shan people, although mostly only superficially. The Wa who abandoned their traditional animistic ways became known as the 'Tame Wa'.

In the late 19th century the Wa ruler of Son Mu welcomed the Panthay, a community of persecuted Hui Muslims that had fled across the Nam Ting to settle in his territory. Initially the relations between the Muslim settlers and the Wa were good, for the Panthays had gained at Pan Long a safe base for their commercial operations out of reach from their Chinese persecutors. The Wa, on the other hand, expected to gain from the trade that the Muslims they had sheltered would generate in their new mountain abode. However, neither side trusted the other, and it was the more sophisticated Panthays who eventually profited most from the assistance they had been given. They carried out their commerce on mule caravans across the mountains, becoming skilled muleteers and seeing their trade in the Burma-Yunnan frontier region flourish. Sir Hugh Daly, British superintendent of the Northern Shan States, described the Panthay colony at Pan Long as 'powerful' during a visit to the Wa States in 1891. At that time there were between 300 and 400 houses in the place and it had become the largest settlement of Chinese Muslim expatriates in the region. The community owed its growth to a high birthrate and the intermarriage with women of Chinese and Shan descent. Daly also commented that the Panthay muleteers were well-armed.

=== The Wa-Panthay War ===
In the first fifty years of their presence in Wa territory the Hui Muslim settlers had gradually extended their influence from their base at Panlon over their Wa neighbours. Panlon became the most powerful community in the Wa States and this growth in power and prestige allowed the Panthay settlement to enjoy a great measure of autonomy. According to Sir George Scott most of the Panthays were Sunni Muslims of the Hanafi school of thought that traced their roots to Dali, Menghua, Baishan, Fengqing and Yuxian, and were all merchants, mule-owners and "Men of substance". They used both Chinese and Arabic names and were the de facto upholders of the law in the unadministered Wa State. By the early 20th century the Panthays had increased their economic and military control in the area to such an extent that the relations between the Muslim settlers and their Wa hosts turned sour.

Finally in 1926 the tensions erupted into the local "Wa-Panthay War" in which the Panthays at Pan Long would boast to a group of British visitors that "... neither the Chinese nor the British mean anything to us. It is we who rule here." The war lasted throughout 1926 and 1927 and eventually the less organized Wa were defeated by the Muslim traders.

Despite their victory the Panthay population of the Wa States declined from 1,517 (1,076 males and 441 females) in 1921 to 1,106 (685 males and 421 females) according to the 1931 Census of India. The reason was that the dominance of the Muslim Panthays in the trade of the Wa frontier region had begun to wane. Barely a decade after the Wa-Panthay War the construction of the Burma Road between Lashio and Kunming in 1937–38 further set back the traditional mule caravan trade in which the Hui Muslim settlers had specialized. Finally the exodus of thousands of Yunnanese refugees and Kuomintang troops following the Chinese Communist Revolution in 1949 brought a flood of predominantly non-Muslim Han Chinese, but almost no Huis, to the area of the Wa States and Shan State. In the wake of these developments many Panthays left the Wa territories and chose to migrate to Northern Thailand, where they became part of the community known as Chin Haw.

=== Modernization of the Wa States ===
Christian missionaries went into the Wa region in the early 20th century, reaching first the Burmese and later also the Chinese areas of Wa territory. William Young, from Nebraska, studied in depth the Wa language and was instrumental in putting it into writing using a script based on the Latin alphabet. The first publication in the Wa language, a compilation of Wa hymns, was printed in 1933.

In the 1940s, during the Chinese Civil War, remnants of the Chinese National Revolutionary Army retreated to territory within Burma as the People's Liberation Army took over mainland China. Some troops remained in the area east of the Salween River, where in later years Wa insurgent groups controlled the region with the support of the Communist Party of Burma. The Wa States were officially merged into the Shan State in post-independent Burma, but the administration of the Burmese government was not reaching the Wa region and the Shan nationalist armed groups left the area alone as well.

After decades of negotiation between the Chinese and the British, the China-Burma border was finalized in 1960. The border ran through the Wa region, cutting it in half, although the border had little practical effect on the Wa people.

From 1966 to 1969, various Wa chieftains formed guerilla bands to defend their land. These groups were threatened by raids from Chinese nationalist guerillas and pressured to disarm by the Tatmadaw.

The Communist Party of Burma arrived in the Wa region in the late 1960s. It built alliances with several Wa guerilla leaders in 1969 and incorporated them into its struggle against the Burmese state. During the Communist Party of Burma era, the Wa region had little internecine warfare and there were few Burmese attacks.

Some towns experienced a modern administration for the first time during local communist rule. Throughout that period opium cultivation and drug trafficking increased and the ancient Wa traditional life became disrupted. However, for the first time in history an administrative system that collected revenue and maintained a significant armed force, as well as a rudimentary infrastructure, ushered the Wa region into the modern era.

In 1989, a mutiny by Wa soldiers within the Communist Party of Burma Armed Forces ejected the Party and resulted in immediate ceasefire with the Myanmar government. After the ceasefire, the Myanmar government began to call the region "Shan State Special Region No. 2 (Wa Region)" (Parauk: Hak Tiex Baux Nong (2) Meung Man). Academic Andrew Ong writes that this name was used by the government in order to indicate that it was subordinate to the Shan State government. The United Wa State Army was formed after the mutiny and April 17, 1989 is viewed as the beginning of the autonomous Wa State polity. The UWSA continued to refer to the area as Meung Vax in Wa or wabang in Chinese.

== States ==
There were many historical Wa states, but there is hardly any information about them; some of the 'states' were little more than small villages and their surrounding territory. Usually these villages were roughly fortified and were built on hilltops or slopes. Occasionally these small states formed confederations, but since the vision of the Wa was restricted to their immediate surroundings, these alliances were neither far-reaching nor long-lasting.

A great number of the communities living in the mountain villages had difficulties regarding water supply. The Wa used to build ponds to collect water and a system of bamboo pipes that brought water from the surrounding hills.

=== States ruled by Saophas ===
The saopha of Mang Lon was a Buddhist Wa. Besides Manglon, five Wa States were known to be ruled by saophas who adopted some of the manners of the rulers of the Shan States and were assisted by amafs or ministers in the various departments:

- Hrawng Nang
- Kang Hsü
- Kawng Maum
- Maw Mang
- Na Hpaw
- Ngek Hting
- Ngek Lek. The saopha of Ngek Lek sent a letter to Sir George Scott in 1897. He requested Scott not to pass through his territory because the sight of the British expedition would alarm the women and children.
- O Mu
- Sao Hin. The first chairman of the United Wa State Party (UWSP) was Zhao Ni-Lai, a former military leader of the Sao Hin saopha, who joined the Communist Party of Burma (CPB) in 1969.
- Son Mu. The saopha of Son Mu or Sonmu, who allowed the Hui Muslim Panthays to settle in his territory in exchange for a yearly tribute of 100 Rs, is mentioned in the records of the events that later led to the Wa-Panthay War.

=== Other Wa States ===
- Maw Hpa and Mot Hai are states mentioned by Scott to be inhabited by the 'Tame Wa', a named used to refer to the non-headhunting Wa influenced by Buddhism.
- Loi Lön and Santong, where allegedly lead was found, are two further Wa States mentioned in The Imperial Gazetteer of India.

== Culture ==
The biggest celebration in the Wa region is the New Harvest Festival. It occurs annually in either August or September after the conclusion of rice harvests. General, festivals are held at the regional or district levels of government, although some wealthier townships of Wa State also host their own festivals.

== See also ==
- Chinese Shan States
- Federated Shan States
- Manglon
- Wa people
