= Möng Lem =

Tai state in Yunnan

Coordinates: 22°18′N 99°25′E

- State of the Shan States under the suzerainty of China
- 1289–1950
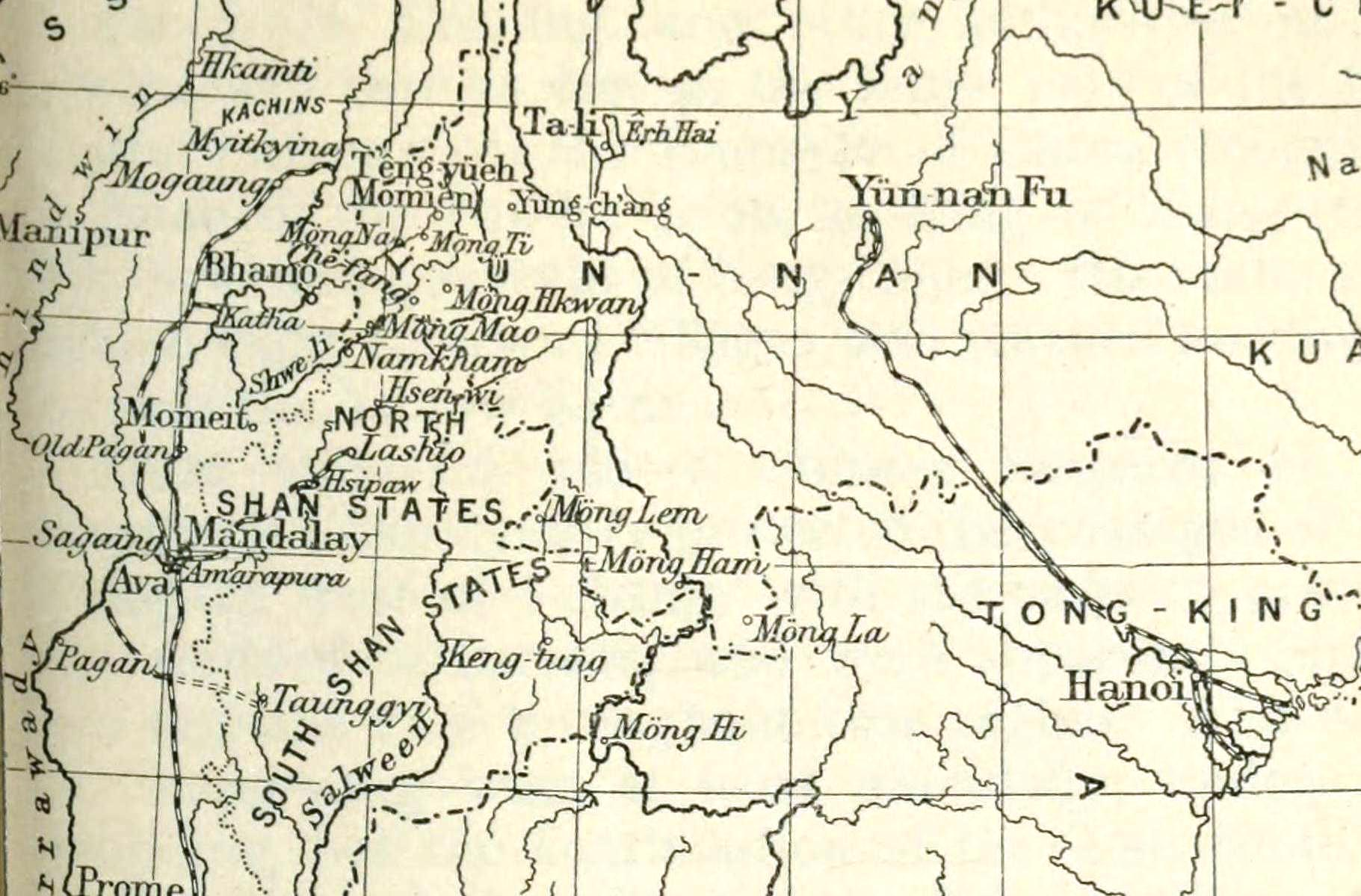
- Möng Lem in a 1910 map including the Chinese Shan States
- History
  - Established: 1289
  - Annexed by China: 1950
- Today part of: Menglian Dai, Lahu and Va Autonomous County, China

Möng Lem or Moeng Laem (Tai Nüa: ᥛᥫᥒᥰ ᥘᥥᥛᥰ; Chinese: 孟連), also known by its Chinese name Menglian, was a Tai Nüa state in what is today Menglian County in Yunnan, China.

== History ==
Möng Lem was established as a tusi state of the Yuan dynasty in 1289. The state was subdued by Möng Mao (Luchuan) in the 14th–15th centuries.

Möng Lem was one of the Koshanpye or "Nine Shan States" in China. The others were Möngmāu, Hsikwan, Möngnā, Sandā, Hosā, Lasā, Möngwan and Küngma (Köng-ma). It was a tributary both of Kingdom of Burma and China until the late 19th century when the British signed an agreement that made the Chinese Shan states become part of China.

The rulers of the state bore the title saopha.

=== Saophas ===
- Hkam Pak Hpa 1289-1309
- Thao Hkam Hueng (Thao Fai Hueng) 1308-1348
- Thao Hkam Suan (Thao Fai Suan) 1349-1406
- Thao Fai Hkan 1407-1439
- Thao Fai Hkaan 1440-1465
- Thao Fai Hke 1466-1481
- Thao Fai Htaan 1482-1492
- Thao Fai Chin 1493-1514
- Thao Fai Hpa 1515-1547
- Thao Fai Hkang 1548-1560
- Thao Fai Kyoung 1561-1581
- Thao Fai Sing 1582-1595
- Thao Fai Hkuen 1595-1603
- Thao Fai Tin 1603-1662
- Thao Fai Lae 1662-1708
- Thao Fai Yew 1709-1737
- Thao Fai Soon 1738-1762
- Thao Hseng Fai Yong (Thao Fai Yong) 1762-1765
- Thao Fai Hsen 1766-1768
- Thao Fai Sin 1769-1790
- Thao Fai Koong 1791-1805
- Thao Fai Sang 1805-1813
- Thao Fai Ming 1814-1826
- Thao Fai Soen 1827-1847
- Thao Fai Sawn 1848-1879
- Thao Fai Hua 1880-1893
- Thao Fai Yawng 1894-1930
- Thao Fai Hkong 1931-1949 (the last saopha)

== See also ==
- Chiang Hung
