= Menglian Dai, Lahu and Va Autonomous County =

Menglian County 孟连县 · gaeng līam
- Autonomous county
- 孟连傣族拉祜族佤族自治县; Menglian Dai, Lahu and Va Autonomous County
- Location of Menglian County (red) and Pu'er City (pink) within Yunnan province

- Location of the seat in Yunnan
- Coordinates: 22°19′44″N 99°35′02″E
- Country: China
- Province: Yunnan
- Prefecture-level city: Pu'er
- GB/T 2260 CODE: 530827
- County seat: Nayun

Area
  - Total: 1,957 km^{2} (756 sq mi)
- Elevation: 1,300 m (4,300 ft)

Population (2020 census)
  - Total: 144,693
  - Density: 73.94/km^{2} (191.5/sq mi)
- Time zone: UTC+8 (China Standard Time)
- Postal code: 665800
- Area code: 0879
- Website: www.menglian.gov.cn
- ^{1}Yunnan Statistics Bureau^{2}Puer Gov.^{3}Yunnan Portal

Menglian Dai, Lahu and Va Autonomous County (simplified Chinese: 孟连傣族拉祜族佤族自治县; traditional Chinese: 孟連傣族拉祜族佤族自治縣; pinyin: Mènglián Dǎizú Lāhùzú Wǎzú Zìzhìxiàn; Awa: gaeng līam) is an autonomous county in the southwest of Yunnan Province, China, bordering Ximeng County to the north, Lancang County to the north, northeast, and east, and Burma's Shan State to the south and west. It is the westernmost county-level division of Pu'er City.

== Administrative divisions ==
Menglian Dai, Lahu and Va Autonomous County comprises five towns and two townships.

Towns

- Nayun (娜允镇)
- Mengma (勐马镇)
- Mangxin (芒信镇)
- Fuyan (富岩镇)

Townships

- Jingxin (景信乡)
- Gongxin (公信乡)

== Climate ==
Climate data for Menglian, elevation 945 m (3,100 ft), (1991–2020 normals, extremes 1981–present)
Month	Jan	Feb	Mar	Apr	May	Jun	Jul	Aug	Sep	Oct	Nov	Dec	Year
Record high °C (°F)	29.7 (85.5)	32.0 (89.6)	33.2 (91.8)	35.8 (96.4)	36.0 (96.8)	34.7 (94.5)	35.2 (95.4)	34.4 (93.9)	32.7 (90.9)	32.9 (91.2)	31.5 (88.7)	28.8 (83.8)	36.0 (96.8)
Mean daily maximum °C (°F)	24.2 (75.6)	26.3 (79.3)	29.2 (84.6)	30.7 (87.3)	30.2 (86.4)	29.5 (85.1)	28.5 (83.3)	28.9 (84.0)	29.1 (84.4)	28.1 (82.6)	25.9 (78.6)	23.7 (74.7)	27.9 (82.2)
Daily mean °C (°F)	14.2 (57.6)	16.0 (60.8)	19.3 (66.7)	21.8 (71.2)	23.3 (73.9)	24.1 (75.4)	23.8 (74.8)	23.7 (74.7)	23.1 (73.6)	21.3 (70.3)	17.9 (64.2)	14.8 (58.6)	20.3 (68.5)
Mean daily minimum °C (°F)	8.0 (46.4)	8.6 (47.5)	11.7 (53.1)	15.1 (59.2)	18.7 (65.7)	21.0 (69.8)	21.3 (70.3)	21.1 (70.0)	20.1 (68.2)	18.0 (64.4)	13.7 (56.7)	10.0 (50.0)	15.6 (60.1)
Record low °C (°F)	1.8 (35.2)	2.3 (36.1)	4.2 (39.6)	7.4 (45.3)	12.7 (54.9)	17.1 (62.8)	17.3 (63.1)	16.8 (62.2)	12.1 (53.8)	9.6 (49.3)	5.0 (41.0)	−0.7 (30.7)	−0.7 (30.7)
Average precipitation mm (inches)	19.1 (0.75)	9.3 (0.37)	18.7 (0.74)	40.3 (1.59)	138.4 (5.45)	201.5 (7.93)	293.0 (11.54)	278.5 (10.96)	175.2 (6.90)	121.6 (4.79)	45.4 (1.79)	18.8 (0.74)	1,359.8 (53.55)
Average precipitation days (≥ 0.1 mm)	2.8	2.7	4.2	8.7	17.7	23.6	26.7	25.2	20.0	14.0	7.0	4.1	156.7
Average relative humidity (%)	79	73	69	71	78	84	86	87	86	86	85	84	81
Mean monthly sunshine hours	214.1	234.2	251.3	240.3	211.3	152.0	112.9	137.3	158.7	169.1	174.9	183.0	2,239.1
Percentage possible sunshine	63	72	67	63	52	38	27	35	43	47	53	55	51
Source: China Meteorological Administration all-time October highall-time November record high

== See also ==
- Mong Lem
- Dai people
- Lahu people
- Va people
