= Chaunggauk, Kalaw Township =

Chaunggauk
- Village
- Location in Burma
- Coordinates: 20°40′50″N 96°53′35″E
- Country: Burma
- Region: Shan State
- District: Taunggyi
- Township: Kalaw Township
- Time zone: UTC+6.30 (MST)

Chaunggauk is a village in Kalaw Township, Taunggyi District, Shan State, of Burma (Myanmar). It lies in the Inle Valley north of Inle Lake.
