= Nyaungshwe Township =

Nyaungshwe Township Shan: ဝဵင်းၼၢင်းသူၺ်ႇ ညောင်ရွှေမြို့နယ်
- Township
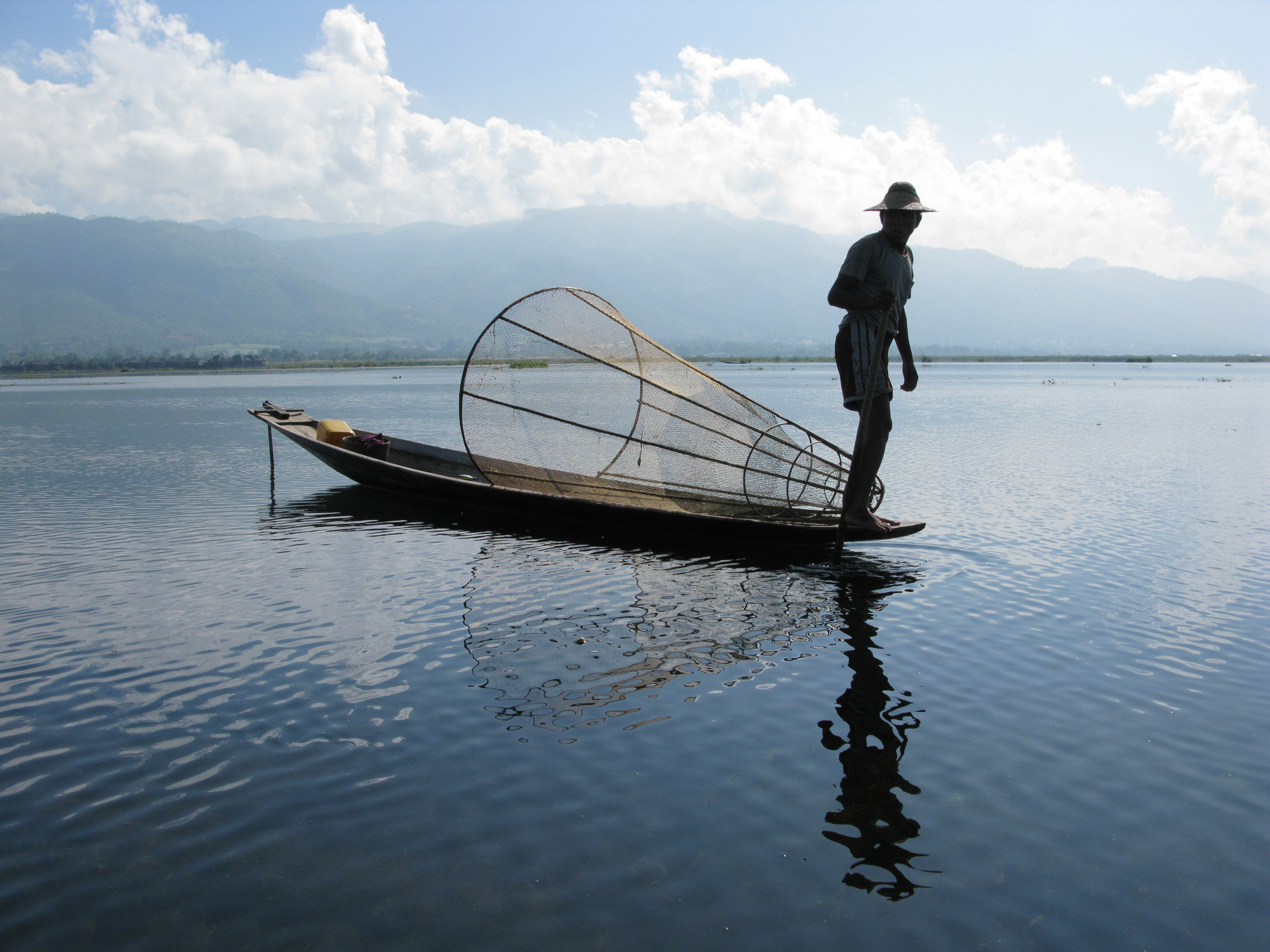
- Fisherman rowing on Inle Lake

- Nyaungshwe Township in former Kalaw District
- Coordinates: 20°27′N 96°54′E
- Country: Myanmar
- State: Shan State
- District: Kalaw District
- Capital: Nyaungshwe

Area
  - Total: 561.40 sq mi (1,454.0 km^{2})
- Elevation: 2,950 ft (900 m)

Population (2023)
  - Total: 188,083
  - Density: 335.02/sq mi (129.35/km^{2})
  - Ethnicities: Intha people; Pa'O; Shan; Bamar; Taungyo
  - Religions: Buddhism
- Time zone: UTC+6:30 (MMT)

Nyaungshwe Township (Burmese: ညောင်ရွှေမြို့နယ်, MLCTS: nyaunghrwe-mrui.nai (Burmese pronunciation: [ɲàʊɰ̃ʃwèmjo̰nɛ̀]); Shan: ဝဵင်းၼၢင်းသူၺ်) is a township of Kalaw District in Shan State, Myanmar. It is located south of Sakangyi and south-west of Taunggyi. The township contains one town, the principal town of Nyaungshwe and 35 village tracts, comprising 8 urban wards and 445 villages in total. Prior to the 2022 reorganisation of districts, the township was part of Taunggyi District.

Inle Lake, a popular tourist destination and an inland freshwater lake, is located in Nyaungshwe township. The larger Inlay Lake Wetland Sanctuary lies in Nyaungshwe, Pinlaung and Pekon Townships.

== History ==
Local historical legend credit King Vidadubha of Kosala as having founded a city called Kosambi in this area that was destroyed by the First Mongol invasion of Burma. A city called Rammawaddy was rebuilt in the area of modern-day Heho, eventually being ruled by the saopha (monarch) of Hsihseng. The town of Nyaungshwe was founded in 1359 by two mythical brothers, Nga Taung and Nga Naung, who arrived from Tavoy, at the behest of the saopha of Hsihseng.

Nyaungshwe was formerly the capital of Yawnghwe, one of many Shan principalities in pre-colonial and colonial Burma. "Nyaungshwe" is a Burmese language approximation of the Shan name, Yawnghwe (Shan: ယွင်ႈႁူၺ်ႈ).

== Geography ==
The township is longer north-south, stretching 36 miles north-south primarily encompassing the valley surrounding Inle Lake. The larger Inle Lake system, part of the Inlay Lake Wetland Sanctuary, stretches south past through the border with Pekon Township. The township lies entirely in the protected Inle Lake watershed and contains 58 streams that drain into Inle Lake. The total watershed of these streams stretch far into neighbouring townships in Taunggyi District. The Inle Lake watershed has experienced conservation pressures from expansion of agriculture, urbanisation and land use changes.

Nyaungshwe Township lies 2,950 feet (900 m) above sea level and sees temperate climates with temperatures ranging from 10.0°C to 46.6°C. From 2016 to 2019, the township saw an average of 35.7 inches of rainfall over an average of 80.7 rainy days.

== Demographics ==
Historical Population
Year	Nyaungshwe Township	±%
1973		—
1983		—
2014	189,407	—
2018	177,747	−6.2%
2019	187,157	+5.3%
*including Ngathaingchaung Subtownship; Source: Ministry of Labor, Immigration, and Population data, General Administration Department

The 2014 Myanmar Census reported that Nyaungshwe Township had a population of 189,407. The population density was 130.3 people per km^{2} and the median age was 26.7 years, with an even 100 males per 100 females. There were 42,634 households; the mean household size was 4.2. In 2019, the population had shrunk slightly to 187,157, but with more households in the township at 45,719 households and a mean household size of 4.1.

The primary ethnic group are the Intha people making up 53.6% of the population. Other groups like the Pa'O people, Shan, Bamar and Taungyo people make up significant portions. The township is majority Buddhist with 99.5% of the population adhering to the faith.

== Attractions ==
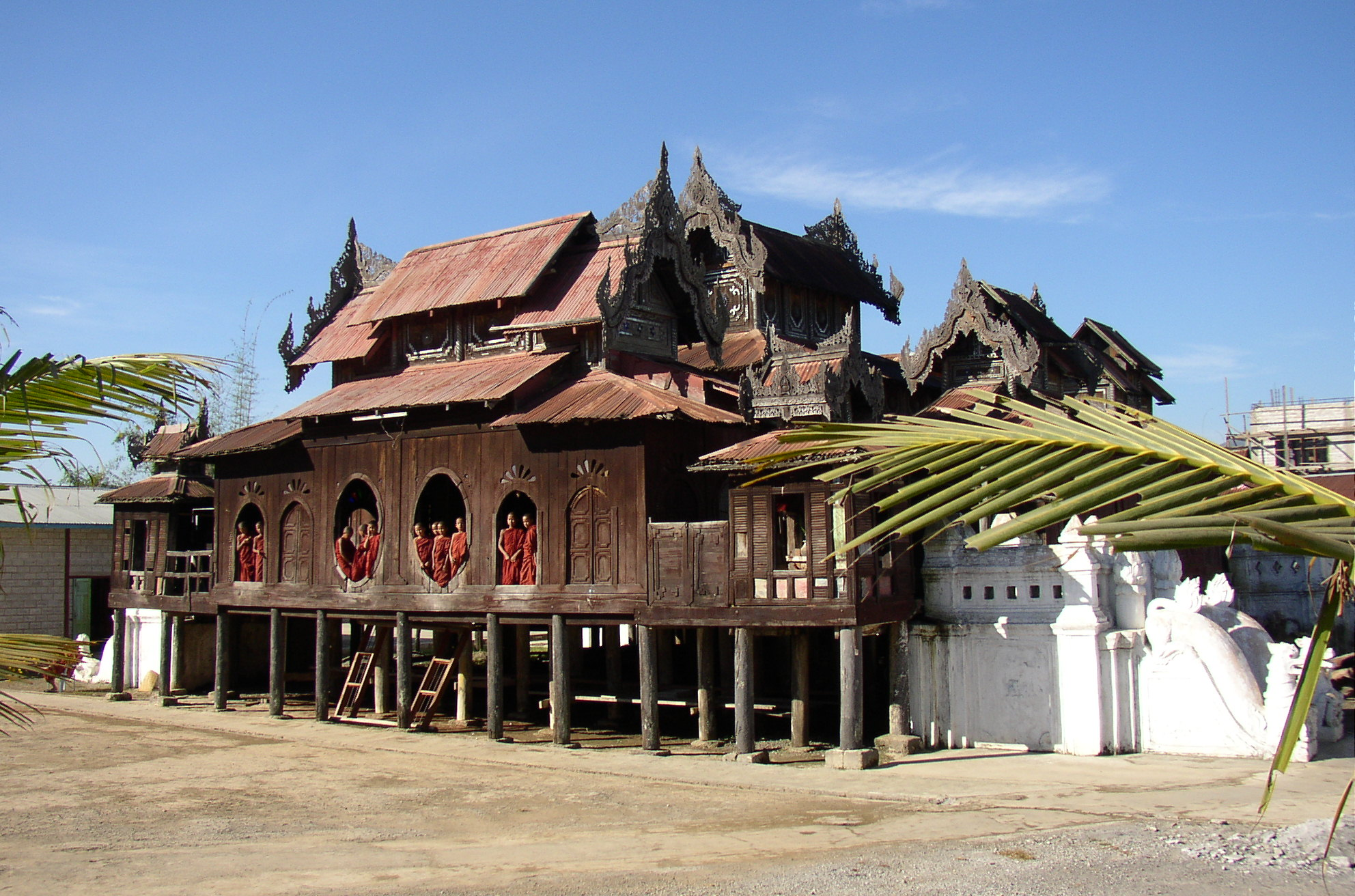
Shwe Yan Pyay Monastery

Nyaungshwe Township is home to Inle Lake and Inlay Lake Wetland Sanctuary, including the village of Ywama, which is home to a floating market. In addition, Nyaungshwe Township has several cultural attractions, including:

- Shwe Yan Pyay, a wooden monastery dating to the 19th century
- Nga Phe Kyaung, a 19th-century wooden monastery known for formerly training cats to jump through hoops.
- Yadana Man Aung Pagoda
- Bawrithat Pagoda, founded by Anawrahta
- Nyaungshwe Cultural Museum
- Phaung Daw U Pagoda
