= Nyaungshwe =

Town in Shan State, Myanmar

Nyaungshwe ယွင်ႈႁူၺ်ႈ ညောင်ရွှေမြို့
- Town
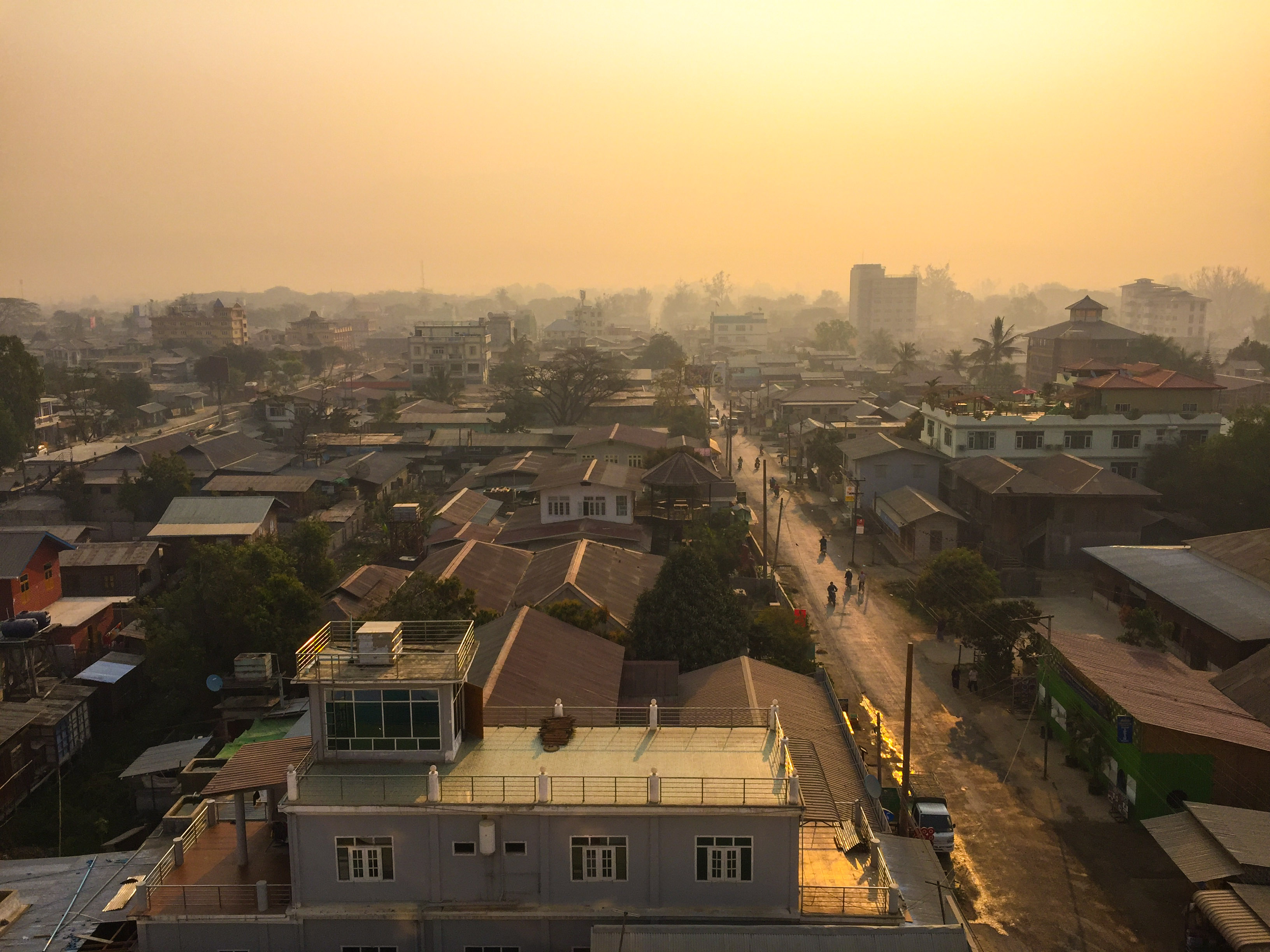
- Sunrise over Nyaungshwe

- Location within Myanmar
- Coordinates: 20°39′N 96°56′E
- Country: Myanmar
- State: Shan State
- District: Kalaw District
- Township: Nyaungshwe Township

Area
  - Total: 1.376 sq mi (3.56 km^{2})
- Elevation: 19 ft (5.8 m)

Population (2019)
  - Total: 14,007
  - Density: 10,180/sq mi (3,930/km^{2})
- Time zone: UTC+6.30 (MMT)

Nyaungshwe (Burmese: ညောင်ရွှေမြို့), is the principal town of Nyaungshwe Township in southwestern Shan State, Myanmar. The town of Nyaungshwe comprises 8 wards, namely Kantha, Thasi, Nandawun, Myole, Win, Nangpang, Mingala, and Maineli. In 2014, the town had 14,072 people. In 2019, the town's population was 14,007. The Nandawun ward is the most popoulous ward with 5,852 residents in 2019. It was the historical capital of the state of Yawnghwe.

Nyaungshwe is the tourist hub for visiting Inle Lake and Inlay Lake Wetland Sanctuary. It consists of one main thoroughfare with numerous side streets and a few parallel roads. The main street has numerous shops, several restaurants, a few stupas, travel agencies and a market (located behind the storefronts). Near the end of this road, a bridge crosses the river channel near an impressive mirror-tiled stupa.

The town serves as a marina for the numerous long boats carrying tourists into the lake. The lake itself is located a few kilometers south through a river channel. Nyaungshwe can be reached by bus, car, or by plane via the airport in Heho, located about a one-hour drive away. Nearby in Shwenyaung there is a train station with services to the mainline at Thazi, where connections to Yangon and Mandalay exist.
