= Paungbyin, Shan State =

Paungbyin ဖောင်းြင်
- Village
- Location in Burma
- Coordinates: 20°39′49″N 96°54′06″E
- Country: Burma
- Region: Shan State
- District: Taunggyi
- Township: Kalaw Township
- Elevation: 878 m (2,881 ft)
- Time zone: UTC+6.30 (MST)

Paungbyin is a village in Kalaw Township, Taunggyi District, Shan State, of Myanmar. It lies in the Inle Valley north of Inle Lake.
