= Kayan National Army =

Ethnic armed organisation in Myanmar

- ကယန်းအမျိုးသားတပ်မတော်
- Flag of the Kayan National Army
- Leader: Khun Saungdu
- Dates active: October 29, 2024 – present
- Headquarters: Pekon Township, Shan State
- Active regions: Demoso Township; Loikaw Township; Pekon Township
- Ideology: Federalism; Democracy; Minority rights Kayan Nationalism
- Wars: Internal conflict in Myanmar

The Kayan National Army (Burmese: ကယန်းအမျိုးသားတပ်မတော်; abbr. KNA) is an armed ethnic Kayan paramilitary group formed from a merger of once-independent smaller guerrilla groups,

== Origins and objectives ==
The KNA was established to unify smaller Karenni anti-junta forces established after the 2021 Myanmar coup d'etat. After overthrowing the State Administration Council junta, the KNA plans to serve as a transitional armed force for a future Karenni state that will encompass areas such as Mobye, Loikaw, Demoso, Pekon, and Pyinmana.

The KNA is reportedly backed by the Kayan New Land Party, which helped establish the KNA as a specifically Kayan ethnic army, in conflict with the inclusive KNDF.

== Relationships with other armed groups ==
Some Karenni people criticized the formation of the KNA as multiple other Karenni anti-junta militias are still active. KNA leadership responded that they will cooperate with groups fighting against the military regime. U Aung San Myint (a party secretary of the Karenni Army's political wing, the Karenni National Progressive Party) also assured that the KNA's formation will not hamper anti-dictatorship efforts.

While the KNA recognizes the authority of the National Unity Government of Myanmar, they are not part of the NUG MOD. Nonetheless, the KNA stated that they will not force Karenni Local PDFs to join them.
