= Kalaw =

Hill town in Myanmar

Kalaw ကလောမြို့ (ဝဵင်းၵၢတ်ႇလေႃႉ)
- Town
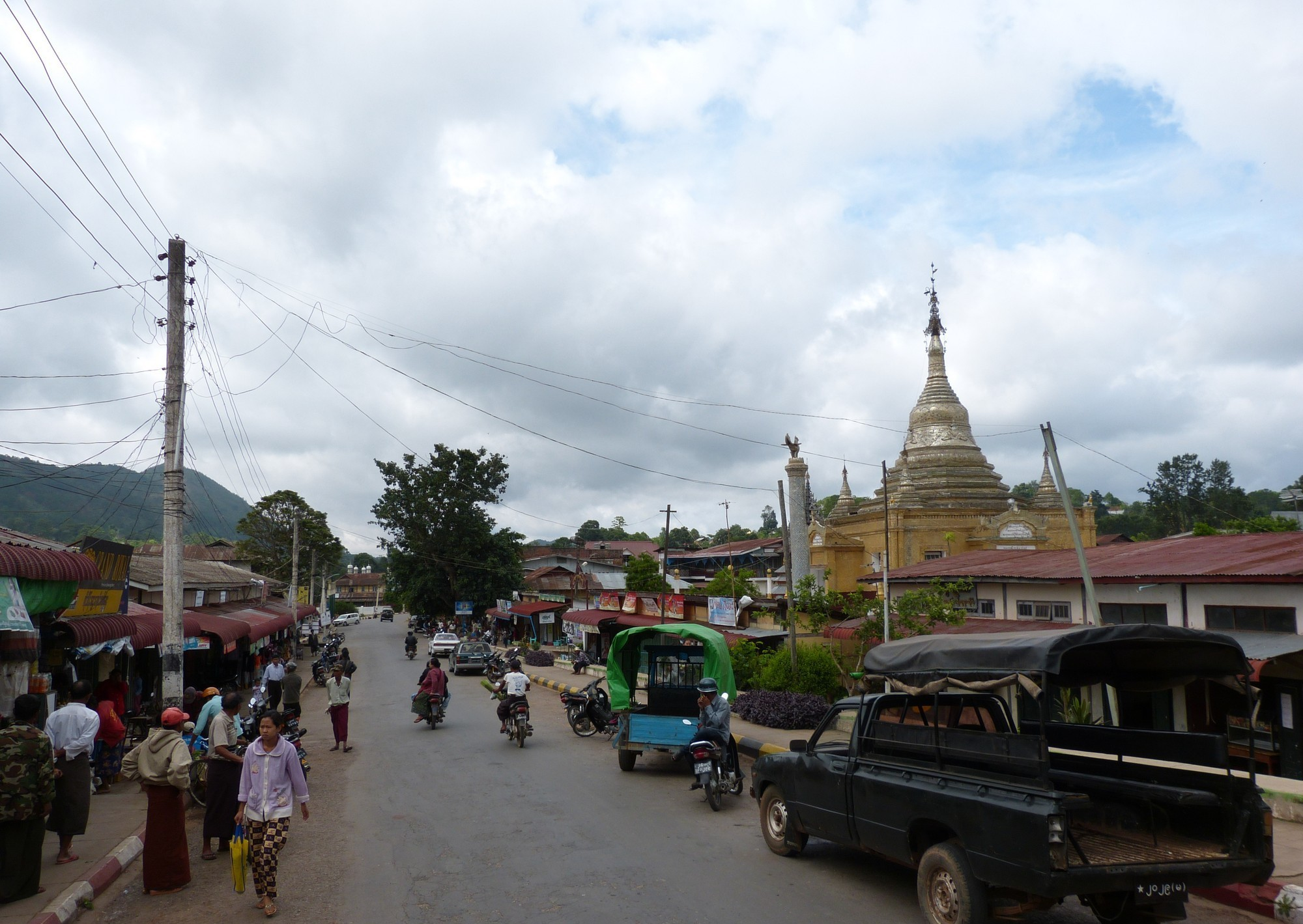

- Location in Myanmar
- Coordinates: 20°38′N 96°34′E
- Country: Myanmar
- State: Shan State
- Districts: Kalaw District
- Township: Kalaw Township

Population (2005)
  - Religions: Buddhism
- Time zone: UTC+6.30 (MMT)

Kalaw (Burmese: ကလောမြို့; Shan: ၵၢတ်ႇလေႃႉ [ka lɔ]) is a hill town in the Shan State of Myanmar. It is the capital of Kalaw District and Kalaw Township.

== Overview ==
The town was popular with the British during the colonial period. Kalaw is the main setting of the novel Das Herzenhören by Jan-Philipp Sendker.

The hill station is located at an elevation of 1310 metres, 50 km from the Inle lake. Kalaw is famous for hiking and trekking. Many trekking trails ranging from nearby places to Inle Lake and Pindaya. The town still feels like a high-altitude holiday resort – the air is cool, the atmosphere is calm and the tree-lined streets still contain a smattering of colonial-era architecture – while the surrounding hills are fine for relatively easy day or overnight treks to Danu, Danaw, Palaung, Pa-O and Taung Yo villages.

In 2022, the town was elevated to a district capital when the Kalaw District was created by the Ministry of Home Affairs.

== History ==
Before colonization, the villages that became Kalaw were a part of the Hsamönghkam chiefdom. In the 1897 census, the eight hamlets that would become Kalaw were listed as having a population of 585 people.

These small villages developed into Kalaw in the early 1900s, as the town hosted a colonial hill station established in the 1890s by the British, and subsequently became a popular tourist destination due to its cool climate and beautiful surroundings. The first hotel was established in 1903 by a British couple, and the railway station was inaugurated in 1915.

In 1919, Catholic nuns established a boarding school, and a Methodist school was established in 1928. By 1931, there were 3,621 recorded residents in Kalaw, including a sizable European population. These foreigners largely began to sell their property when World War II broke out, and in April 1942, the Japanese occupied Kalaw.

During the Japanese occupation, nearly all the foreigners fled Kalaw, while important buildings were turned into a hospital or army camp. Kalaw was bombed by the allies between March and June 1945, destroying and damaging many buildings.

Following the war, most foreigners did not return, or left following Burma's independence in 1948. After the 1962 Burmese coup d'état, the church schools were nationalized, and some commercial property was confiscated. The military would go on to established a "Command & General Staff College" in Kalaw.

With the introduction of the 28 day tourist visa, Kalaw experienced a significant increase in tourism that grew faster after the 2011 transition to an elected government, with domestic tourism increasing as well.

== Notable residents ==
- Smith Dun
