= Shwe Yan Pyay =

- ရွှေရန်ပြေဘုန်းကြီးကျောင်း
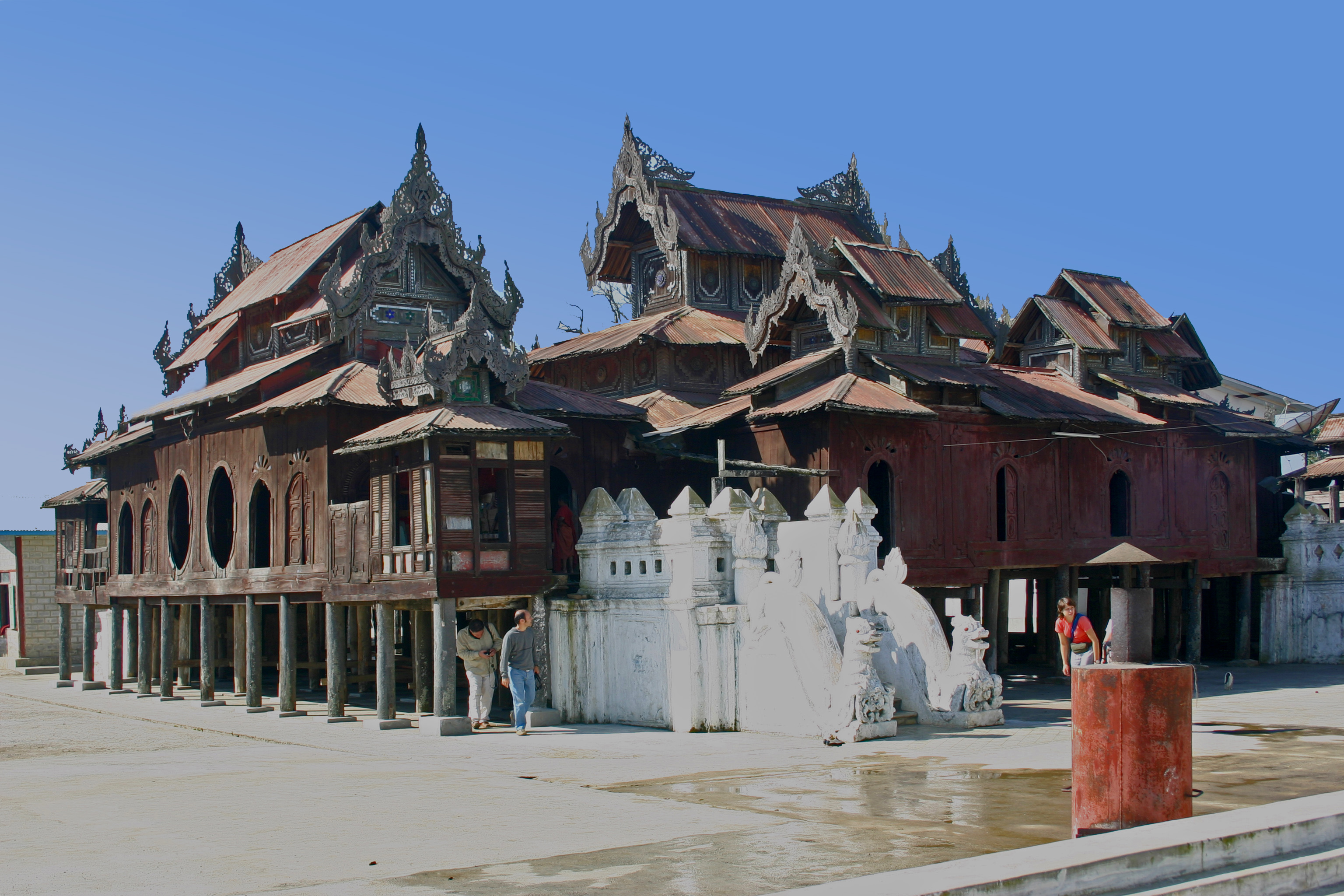
- Shwe Yan Pyay monastery

- Location within Myanmar

Religion
- Affiliation: Buddhism
- Sect: Theravada Buddhism
- Region: Shan State
- Status: active

Location
- Country: Myanmar
- Interactive map of Shwe Yan Pyay
- Coordinates: 20.4058°N 96.5559°E

Architecture
- Established: 1889

Shwe Yan Pyay (Burmese: ရွှေရန်ပြေဘုန်းကြီးကျောင်း) is a Buddhist monastery located in the Nyungshwe Township of Shan State, Myanmar. It was built around 1889 (Burmese year 1251) by Saw Ohn.

== History ==
On 10 February 1887, the British arrived in Nyungshwe Township and met A.H. Hilderbrand, the first British officer assigned to the Shan States, who was stationed there. During the construction period, Shwe Yan Pyay Pagoda was commonly referred to as the "Fort Pagoda".

According to the inscription at the pagoda, the foundation of the Shwe Yan Pyay Pagoda was laid on Tuesday, the 5th waxing day of the First Waso in the year 1250 ME (12 June 1888). The hti (umbrella finial) was installed on Tuesday, the 5th waning day of Nattaw (22 December 1888) at sunset.

In the year 1250 ME (1888–1889), the late Sawbwa of Nyaungshwe donated funds for the simultaneous construction of the Shwe Yan Pyay Pagoda and granted the land within the pagoda precinct.

== Features ==
The monastery is constructed from wood and teak painted in red. It is supported by 167 wooden pillars and has architectural features including mosaic-adorned pillars. There is an oval-shaped windows with artistic and architectural styles.

The Ordination Hall contains Buddha statues, mosaics, mirrors, and crafted wooden decorations.

== Gallery ==
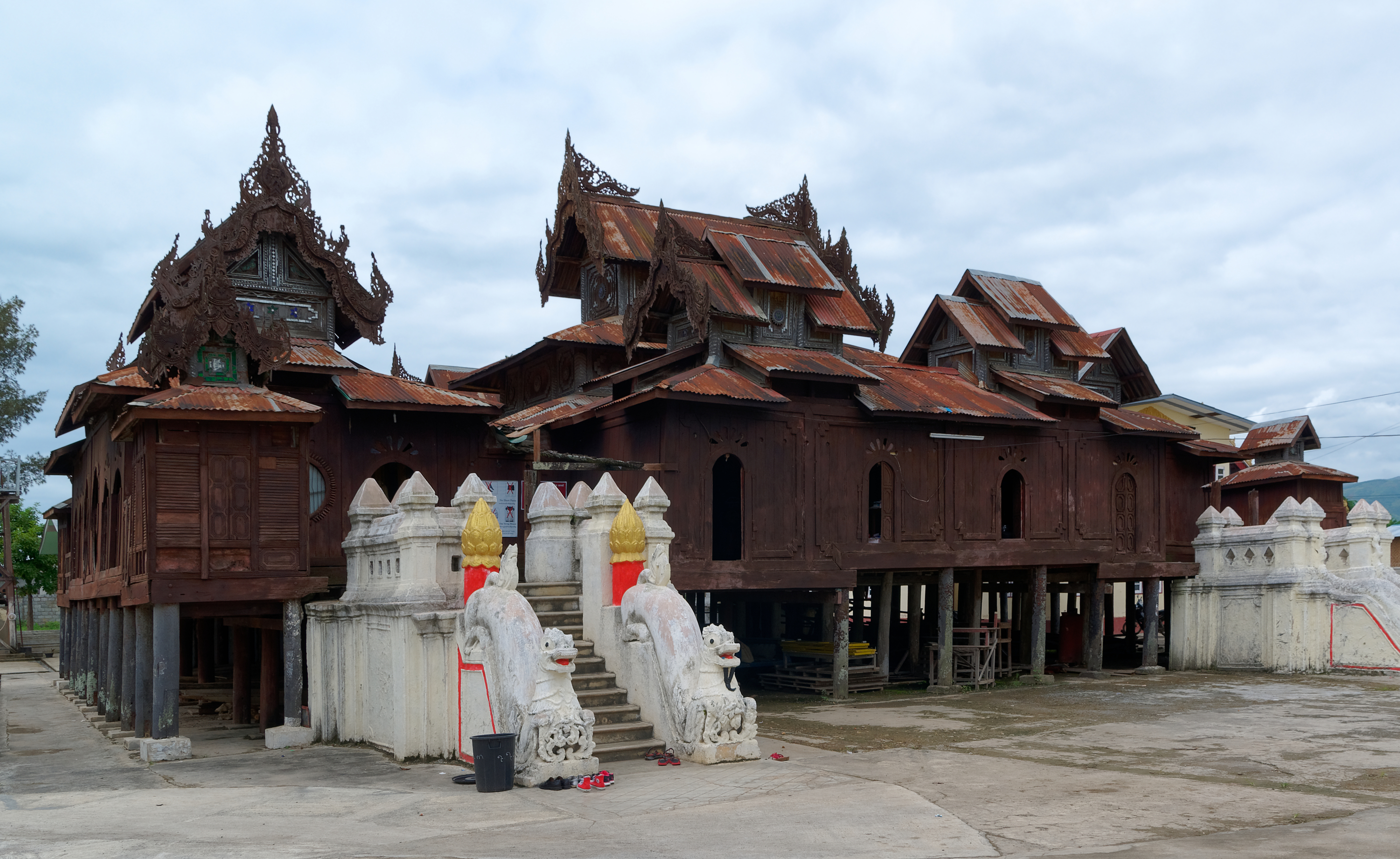

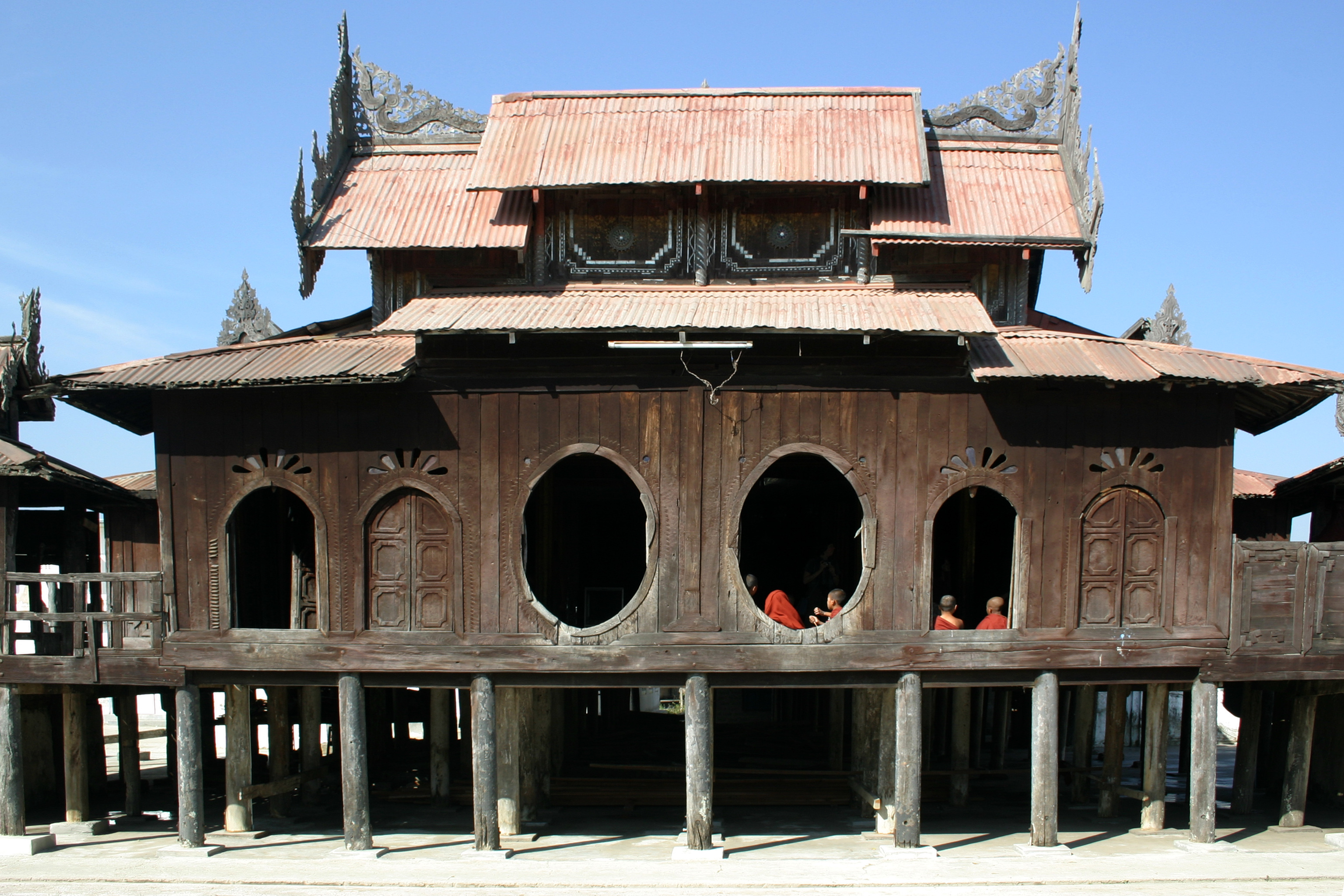

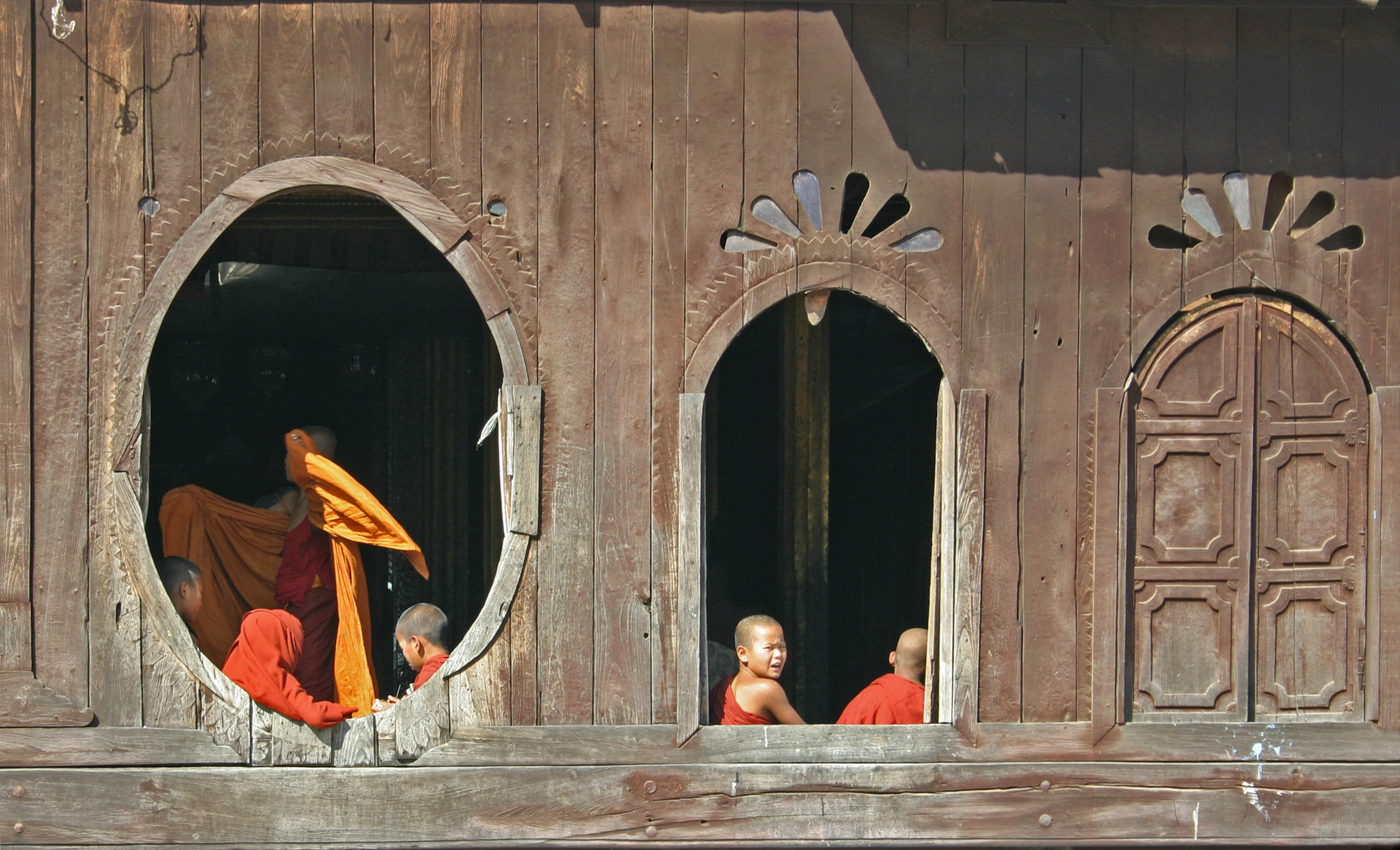

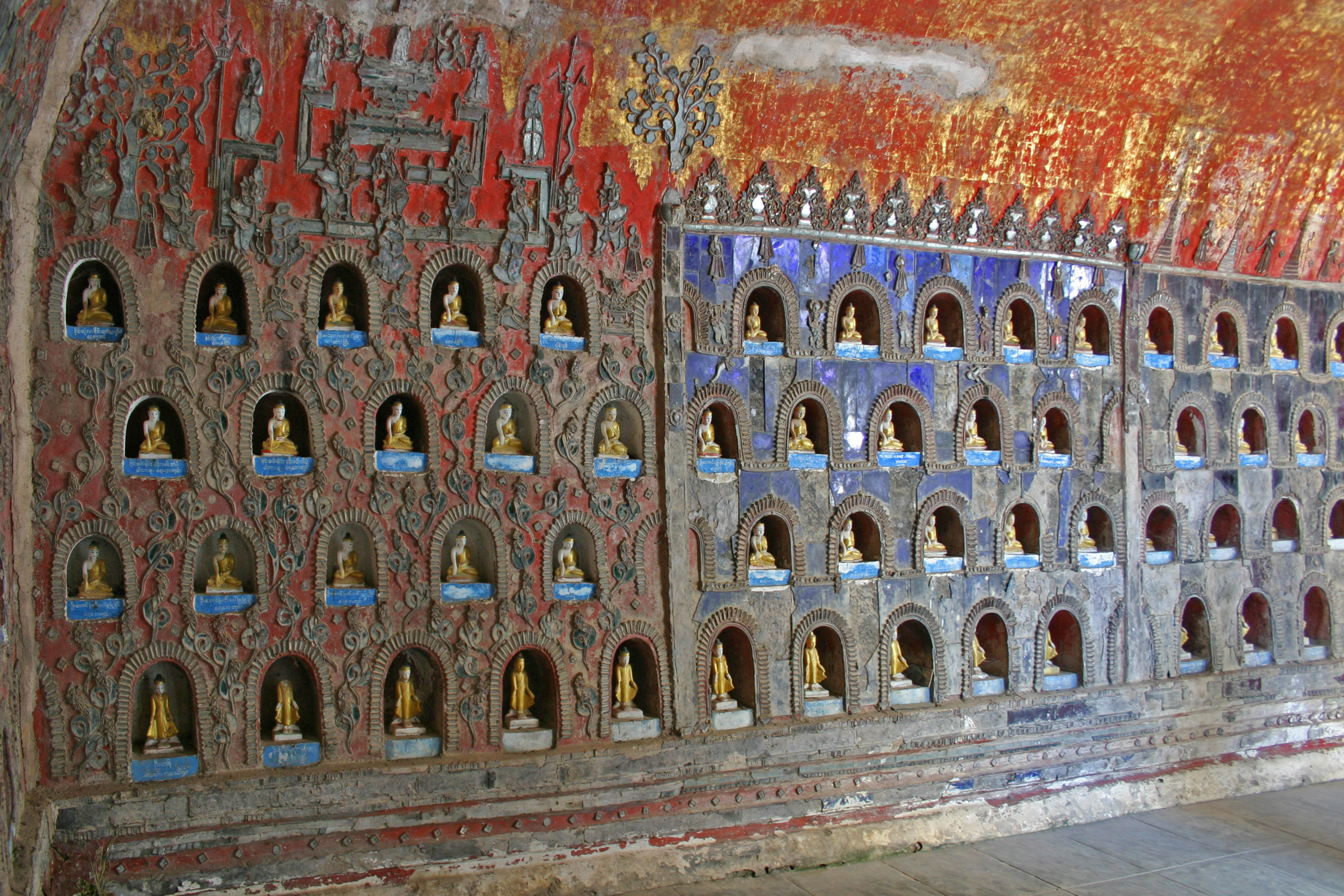

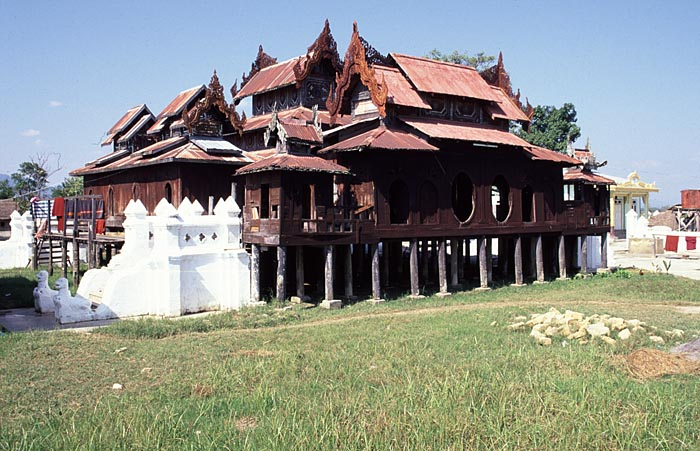

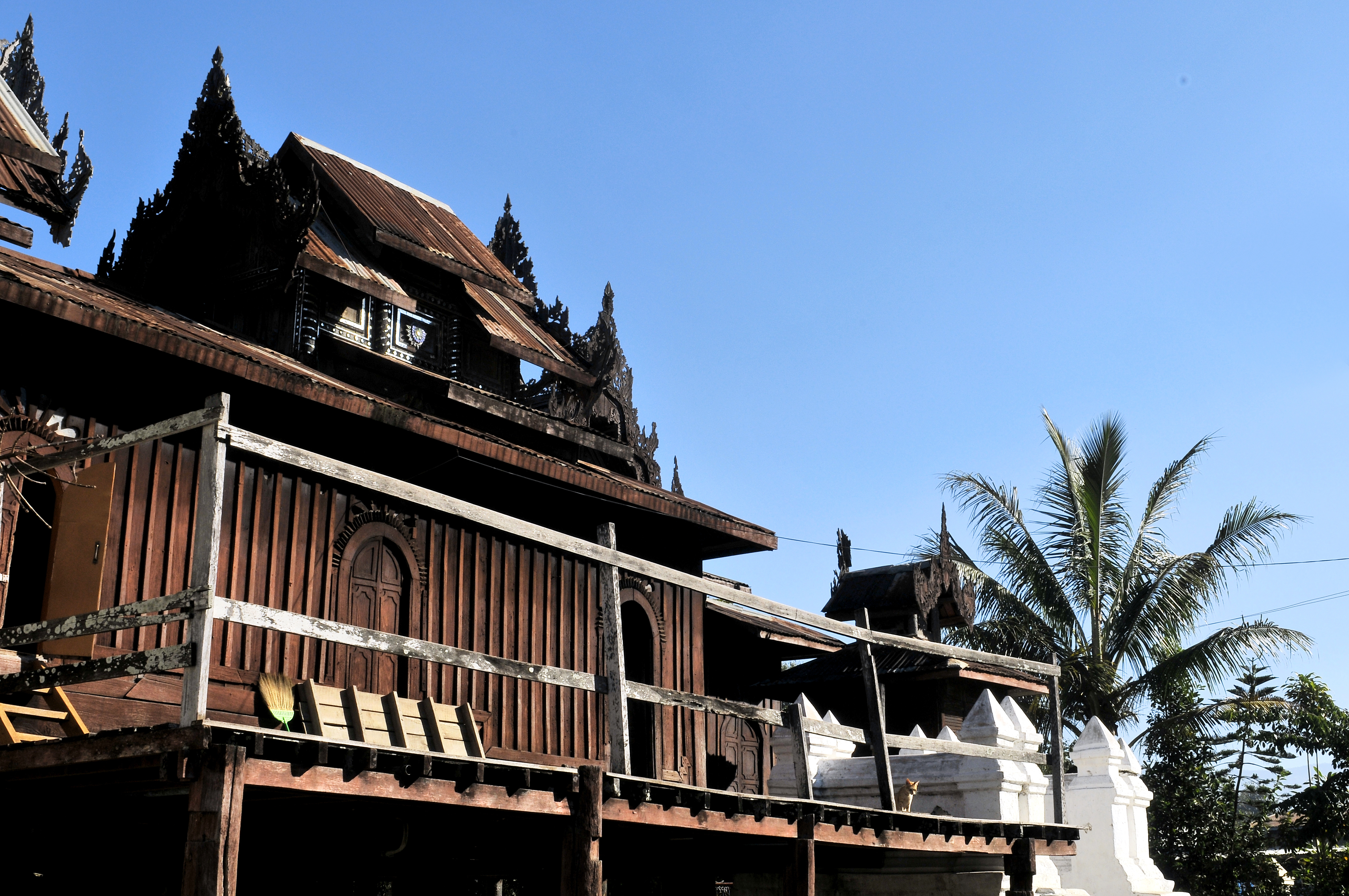

== See also ==
- Nga Phe Chaung
- List of Buddhist temples in Myanmar
