= Heho =

Heho ဟဲဟိုး ဝေင်ꩻဟုဲင်ꩻဟိုꩻ
- Town
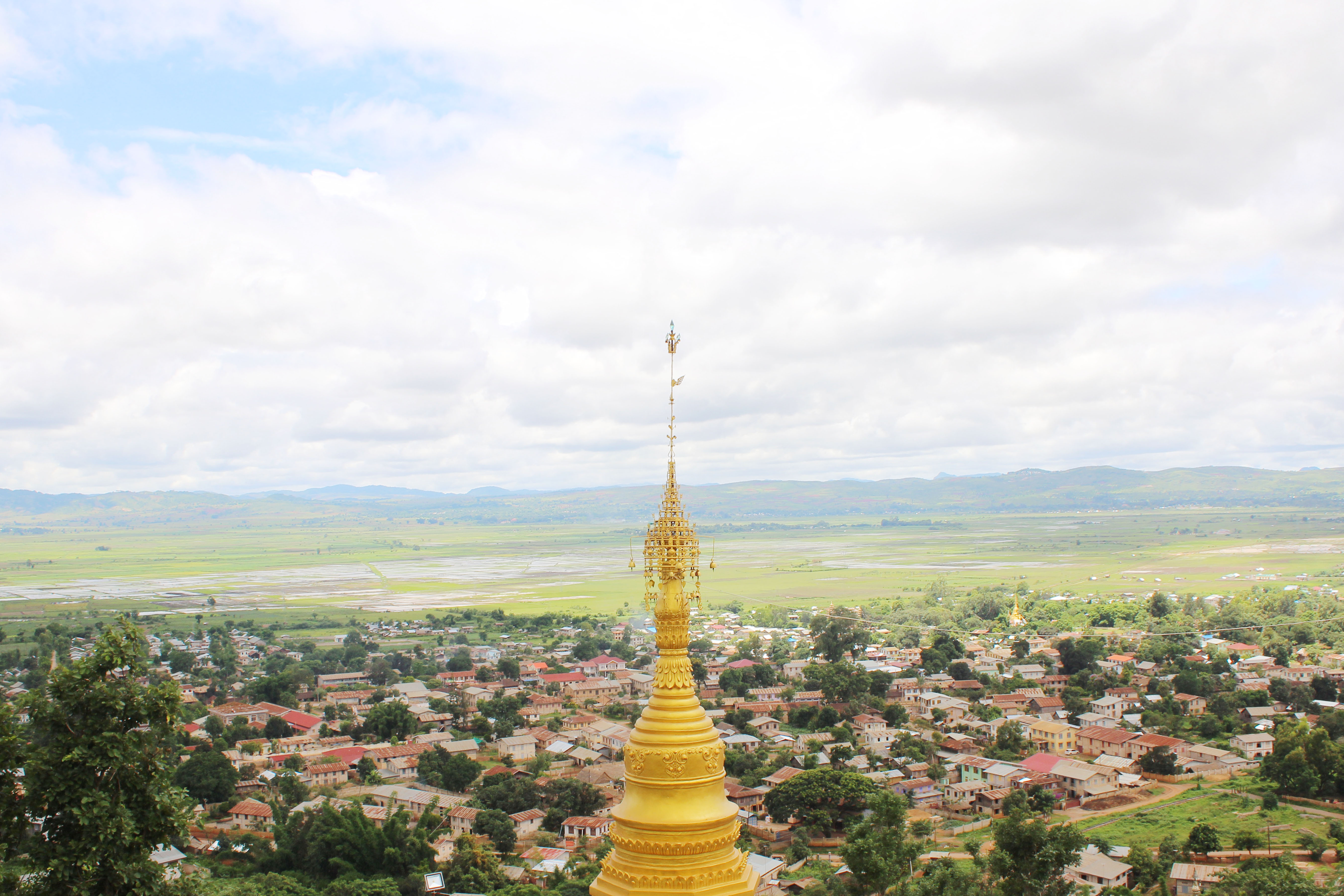
- A view of Heho from Heho Hill

- Location in Myanmar
- Coordinates: 20°43′24″N 96°46′16″E
- Country: Myanmar
- State: Shan State
- District: Kalaw District
- Township: Kalaw Township
- Time zone: UTC+6.30 (MST)

Heho (Burmese: ဟဲဟိုး) is a small town in Kalaw Township, Shan State of Myanmar (formerly Burma). It is the primary air gateway to tourist areas such as Inle Lake.

Heho is connected by NH4 to Sakangyi and Taunggyi, the capital of the Shan State in the east. A dirt road northwest from Heho leads to the old silver-lead mines of Maw Son (Baw Zaing).

== Climate ==
Climate data for Heho, elevation 1,159 m (3,802 ft), (1981–2010)
Month	Jan	Feb	Mar	Apr	May	Jun	Jul	Aug	Sep	Oct	Nov	Dec	Year
Mean daily maximum °C (°F)	24.8 (76.6)	26.8 (80.2)	29.7 (85.5)	31.4 (88.5)	29.2 (84.6)	27.4 (81.3)	26.6 (79.9)	26.7 (80.1)	27.2 (81.0)	27.2 (81.0)	25.5 (77.9)	24.2 (75.6)	27.2 (81.0)
Mean daily minimum °C (°F)	3.9 (39.0)	5.8 (42.4)	10.0 (50.0)	14.9 (58.8)	18.0 (64.4)	19.2 (66.6)	19.1 (66.4)	19.0 (66.2)	18.2 (64.8)	16.3 (61.3)	11.7 (53.1)	6.2 (43.2)	13.5 (56.3)
Average rainfall mm (inches)	7.3 (0.29)	21.5 (0.85)	30.1 (1.19)	65.8 (2.59)	159.9 (6.30)	183.3 (7.22)	329.3 (12.96)	336.3 (13.24)	194.3 (7.65)	78.6 (3.09)	48.6 (1.91)	12.6 (0.50)	1,467.6 (57.78)
Source: Norwegian Meteorological Institute

== History ==
It was a small village of Danu people. The village grew into a town in the 1920s when the single-line railway line was extended from Aungpan to Shwenyaung, and Heho was determined to be a convenient intermediate stop and transfer point. Later an airport was built, 4 km (2.5 mi) northwest of the town. The airport served as an airbase both for the Allies and the Japanese during World War II. The airbase was heavily bombed by the Allies. Evidence of aircraft bunker revetments and bomb craters can still be seen on the southern end of the airfield, especially noticeable from the air.
