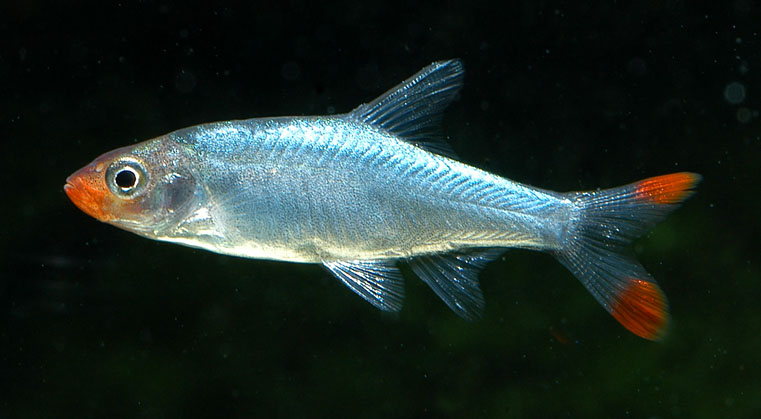
- male

Conservation status
- Endangered (IUCN 3.1)

Scientific classification
- Kingdom: Animalia
- Phylum: Chordata
- Class: Actinopterygii
- Order: Cypriniformes
- Family: Cyprinidae
- Subfamily: Cyprininae
- Genus: Sawbwa; Annandale, 1918
- Species: S. resplendens

Binomial name
- Sawbwa resplendens Annandale, 1918

= Sawbwa barb =

Species of fish

The sawbwa barb (Sawbwa resplendens), also known as the Burmese rammy nose, Asian rummynose or rummynose rasbora, is an endangered species of cyprinid fish in the monotypic genus Sawbwa. The species is endemic to Inle Lake in Myanmar (Burma). It grows to a maximum total length of 3.5 cm (1.4 in). Mature males are iridescent silvery-blue with red snout and red lobes to the tail fin; females are duller without red and with a dark pigmentation spot by the anus. The sawbwa barb completely lacks scales.
