= Pekon =

Pekon ဖယ်ခုံမြို့
- Town
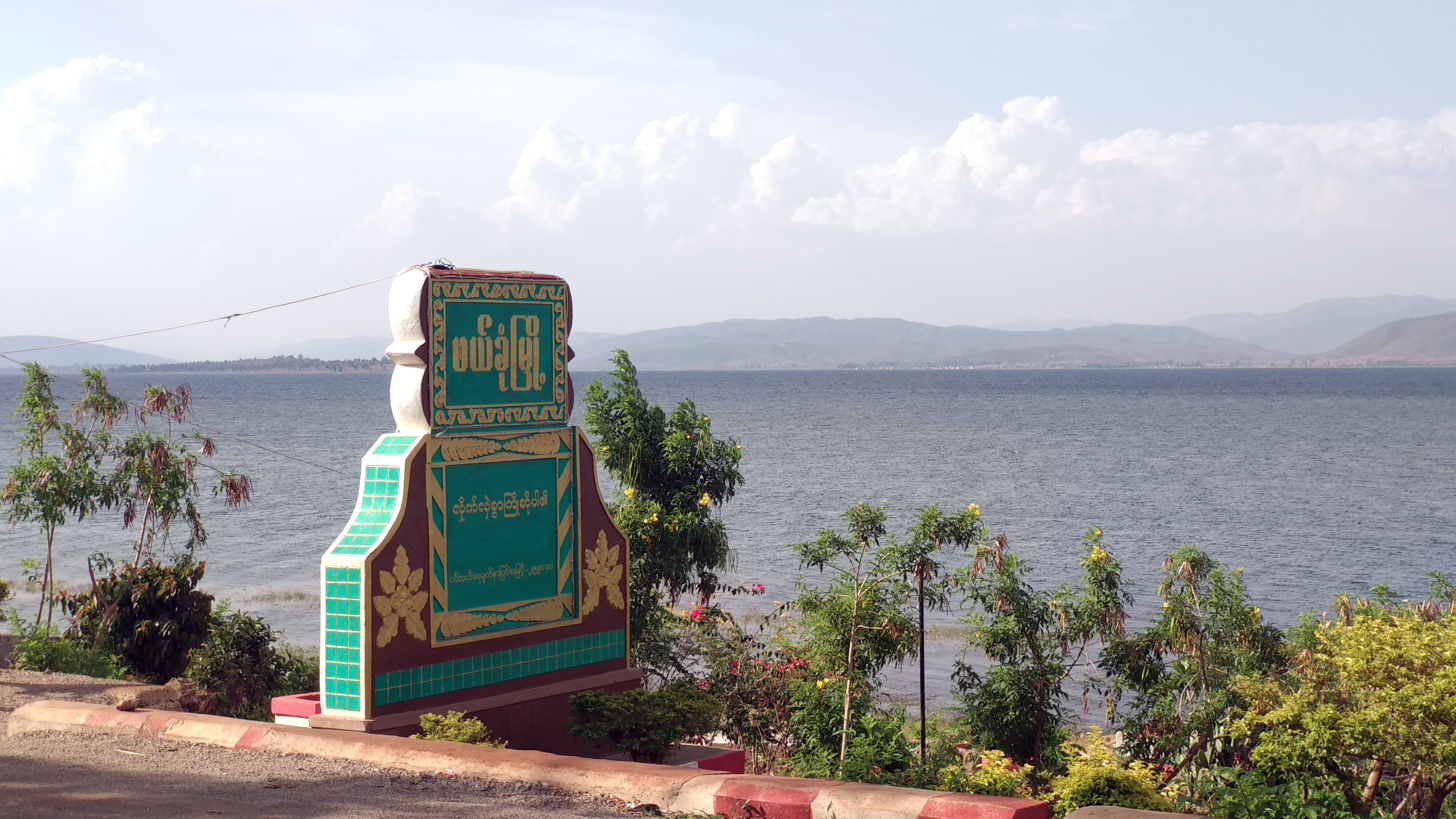
- Pekon sign on the shores of Moebye Reservoir

- Location within Myanmar
- Coordinates: 19.867506°N 96.995882°E
- Country: Myanmar
- Region: Shan State
- District: Kalaw District
- Township: Pekon Township

Area
  - Total: 66.6 sq mi (172 km^{2})

Population (2019)
  - Total: 15,323
  - Density: 230/sq mi (88.8/km^{2})
- Time zone: UTC+6:30 (MMT)

Pekon (Burmese: ဖယ်ခုံမြို့, also spelt Pekhon or Phekhon) is a town in far southern Shan State, eastern Myanmar on the shores of the Mobye Reservoir near the border with Kayah State. It is the seat of the Pekon Township in the Kalaw District. It is divided into 7 wards.

== Demographics ==
In 2018, the town had 15,351 people and decreased slightly to 15,323 people by 2019. Most of the town is inhabited by children, with over 65.4% of the town being under the age of 18 as of 2019. Pekon is primarily inhabited by the Kayan people, a subgroup of the Karenni people. The Kayan reclassified themselves into two further subgroups in 2005 with the Latha people living in Pekon. The town is also the namesake for the standard dialect of the Kayan language- better known as the Padaung language. Pekon Kayan, spoken by the Latha, is not mutually intelligible with the Kayan spoken further into the hills by other Kayan peoples.

== History ==
Pekon is home to the military base for Military Operations Command No. 2 and No. 7. The town bases several supply units and battalions of the Myanmar Army and serves as a logistical hub from the capital Naypyidaw and southern Shan State. During the Myanmar civil war, the town was a target for Karenni resistance forces in 2024 due to its strategic importance. During various clashes, the town was bombed repeatedly by the Myanmar Air Force.
