= Sakangyi, Taunggyi =

Sakangyi
- Town
- Location in Burma
- Coordinates: 20°45′N 96°56′E
- Country: Burma
- State: Shan State
- District: Taunggyi District
- Township: Taunggyi Township
- Time zone: UTC+6.30 (MST)

Sakangyi is a town in Taunggyi Township, Taunggyi District, Shan State, eastern Myanmar. It is located west along National Highway 4 from Aye Thar Yar and Taunggyi. The National Road 43 begins in the eastern part of the town and connects National Highway 4 to National Highway 3 in the north at Nawnghkio. It is connected via National Highway 4 to Heho in the west.
