= Pekon Township =

Pekon Township ဖယ်ခုံမြို့နယ်
- Township
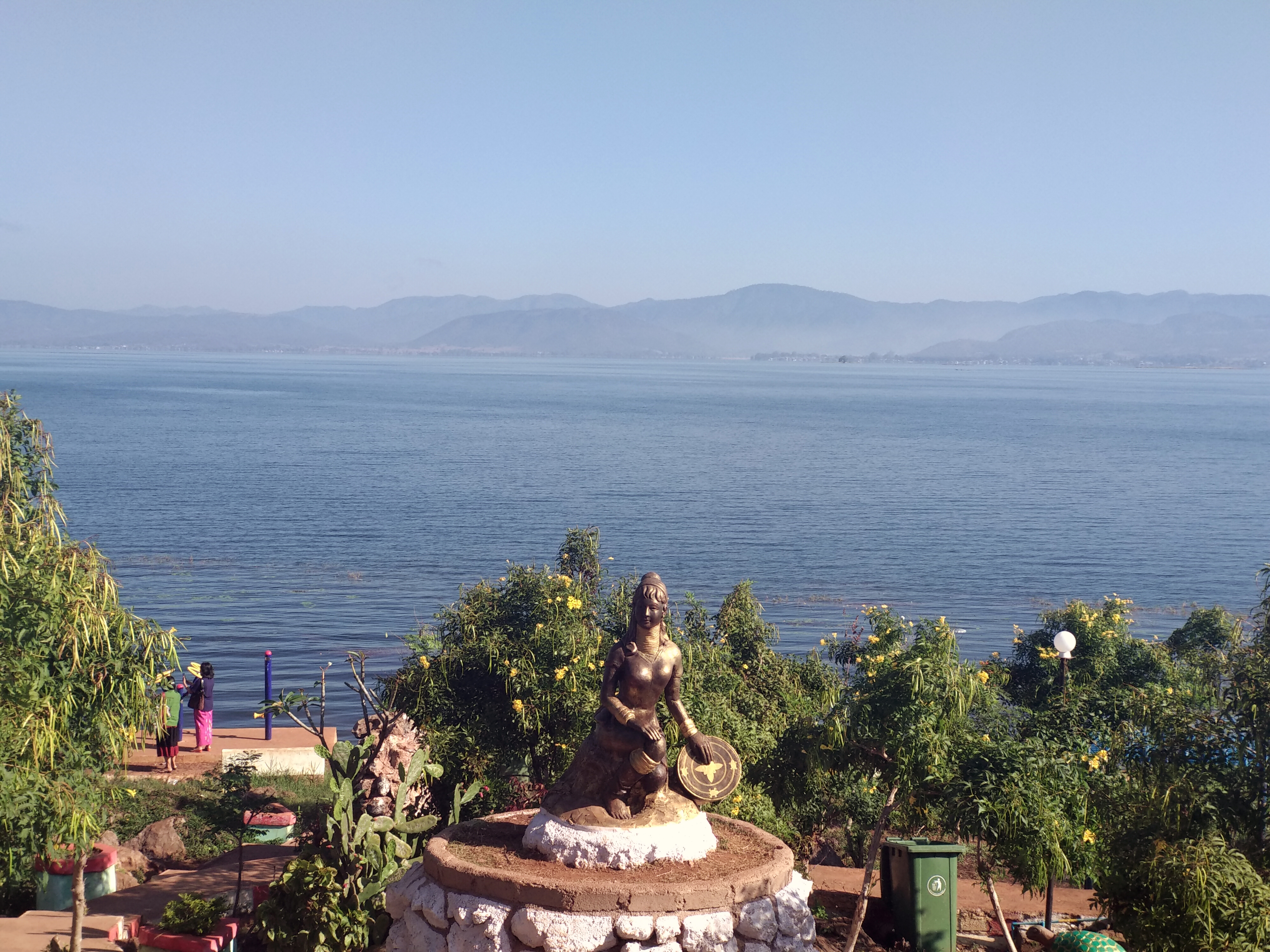
- Moebye Reservoir in Pekon Township

- Location in Kalaw district
- Coordinates: 19.6660°N 96.8844°E
- Country: Myanmar
- Region: Shan State
- District: Kalaw District
- Capital: Pekon

Area
  - Total: 3,807.73 sq mi (9,862.0 km^{2})
- Elevation: 2,950 ft (900 m)
- Highest elevation: 6,000 ft (1,800 m)

Population (2019)
  - Total: 107,841
  - Density: 28.3216/sq mi (10.9350/km^{2})
  - Ethnicities: Kayan; Shan; Bamar; Karenni
  - Religions: Buddhism; Christianity
- Time zone: UTC+6:30 (MMT)

Pekon Township (Burmese: ဖယ်ခုံမြို့နယ်; also spelled Pekhon, Phekhon, Pekong, Pecong, Pékon) is a township of Kalaw District in the Shan State of Myanmar. The principal town is Pekon. The largest settlement in the township is Mobye, a village tract in the east of the township.

Part of a popular tourist place and bird watching site, Inle Lake and Inlay Lake Wetland Sanctuary, lies in this township.

Reportedly, the township's southern police station was occupied and razed by civilian fighters. There is an ongoing battle between civilian fighters and Myanmar military troops.

In late December 2023, various resistance groups of Operation 1111 were able to capture two junta military bases, Shwe Pyi Aye and Lwal Pator, in the township.
