= Kalaw District =

District in Shan State, Myanmar

Kalaw District ကလောခရိုင်
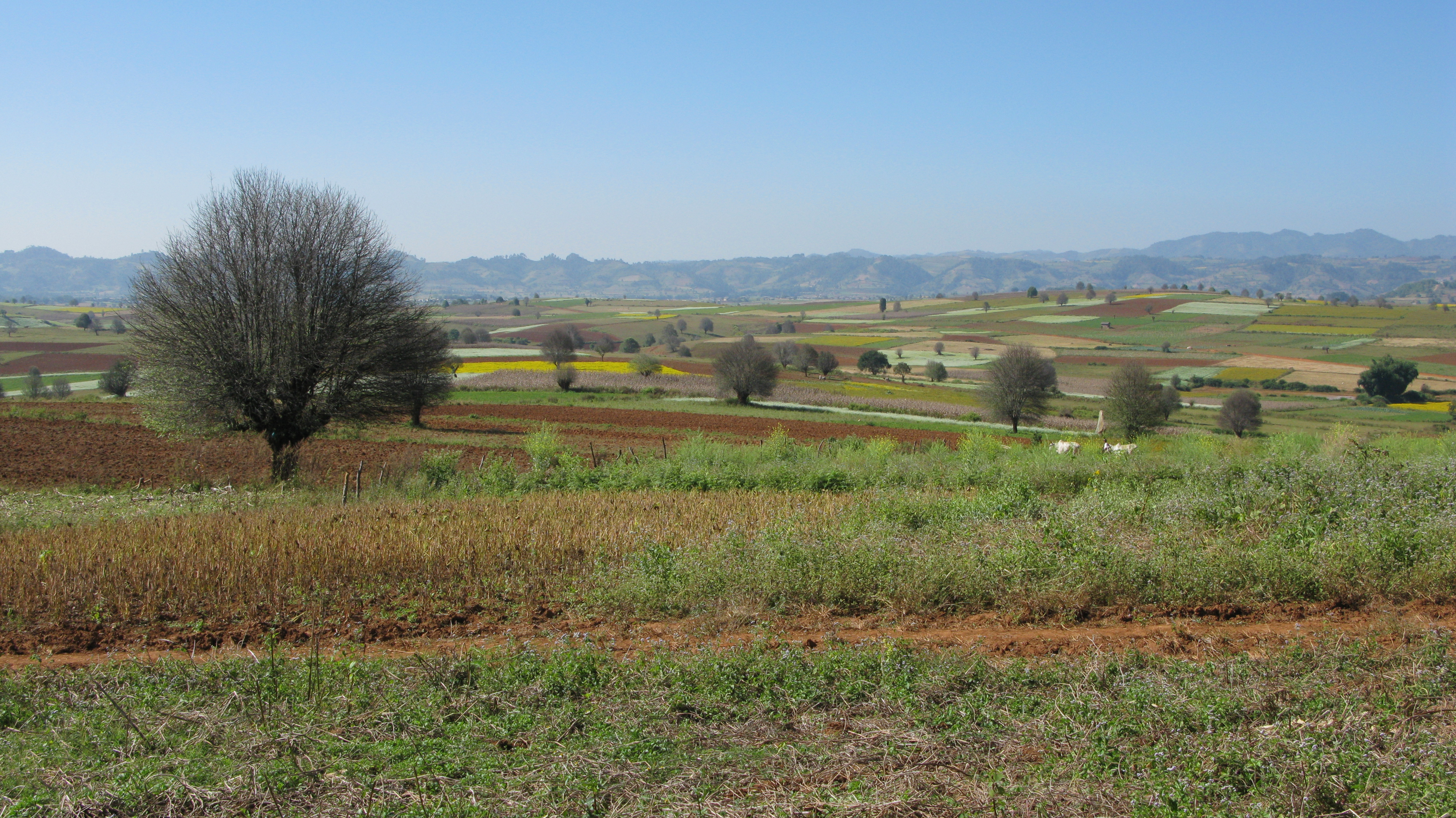
- Hills near Inle Lake, Nyaungshwe Township

- Kalaw District (Red) in Shan State
- Coordinates: 20.196°N 96.879°E
- Country: Myanmar
- Region: Shan State
- Capital: Kalaw
- Time zone: MMT

Kalaw District (Burmese: ကလောခရိုင်) is a district in Shan State, Myanmar. It was split from Taunggyi District on 30 April 2022 and contains three townships. Its district seat is Kalaw.

Popular tourist sites, Inle Lake and Inlay Lake Wetland Sanctuary lies in this district.

== Townships ==
Townships in Kalaw District:

- Kalaw Township
- Nyaungshwe Township
- Pekon Township
