= Inlay Lake Wetland Sanctuary =

- Burmese: အင်းလေးကန် တောရိုင်းတိရစ္ဆာန် ဘေးမဲ့တော
- IUCN category V (protected landscape/seascape)
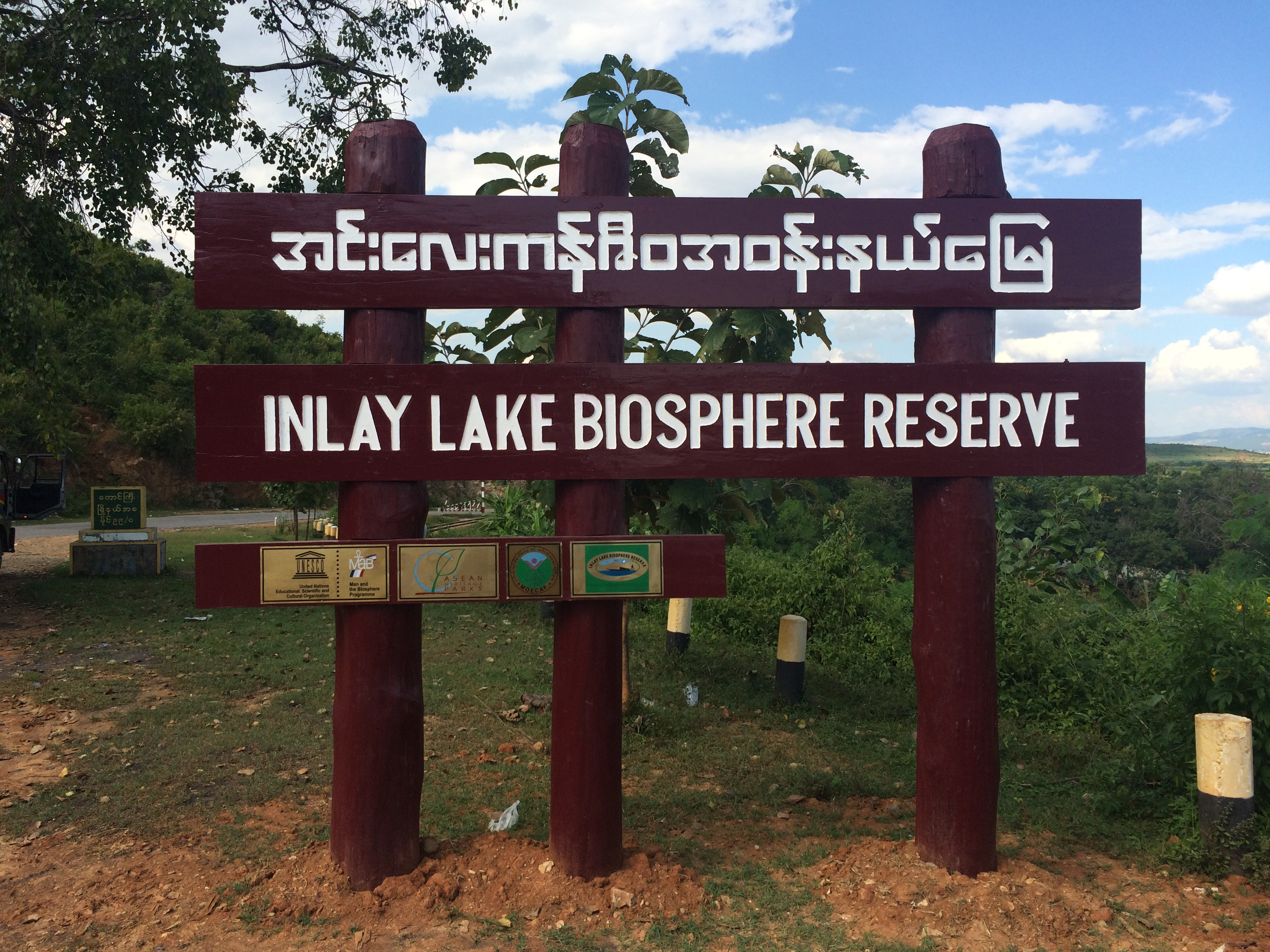
- Entrance to the sanctuary

- Location within Myanmar
- Location: Nyaungshwe, Pinlaung and Pekon Township, Shan State, Myanmar
- Coordinates: 20.13°N 96.56°E
- Area: 533.73 km^{2} (206.07 sq mi)
- Established: 1985
- Governing body: Myanmar Forest Department

Inlay Lake Wetland Sanctuary is a protected area in Myanmar's Shan State, covering an area of 533.73 km^{2} (206.07 sq mi) surrounding Inle Lake. It ranges in elevation from 830 to 1,270 m (2,720 to 4,170 ft), stretching over Nyaungshwe, Pinlaung and Pekon Townships. It was gazetted in 1985 to protect habitats for migratory birds. In 2003, it was designated as one of the ASEAN Heritage Parks, and in 2015 as the first Biosphere Reserve in the country.

255 woodland birds, 90 wetland birds, 59 fish species, 3 turtle species, 94 butterfly species, 25 amphibian and reptile species, and several plant species including 184 orchid and 12 algae species are recorded in this wetland. It was reported that this Sanctuary could be a nesting place for the globally endangered sarus crane.
