= Kalaw Township =

Kalaw Township ကလောမြို့နယ်
- Township
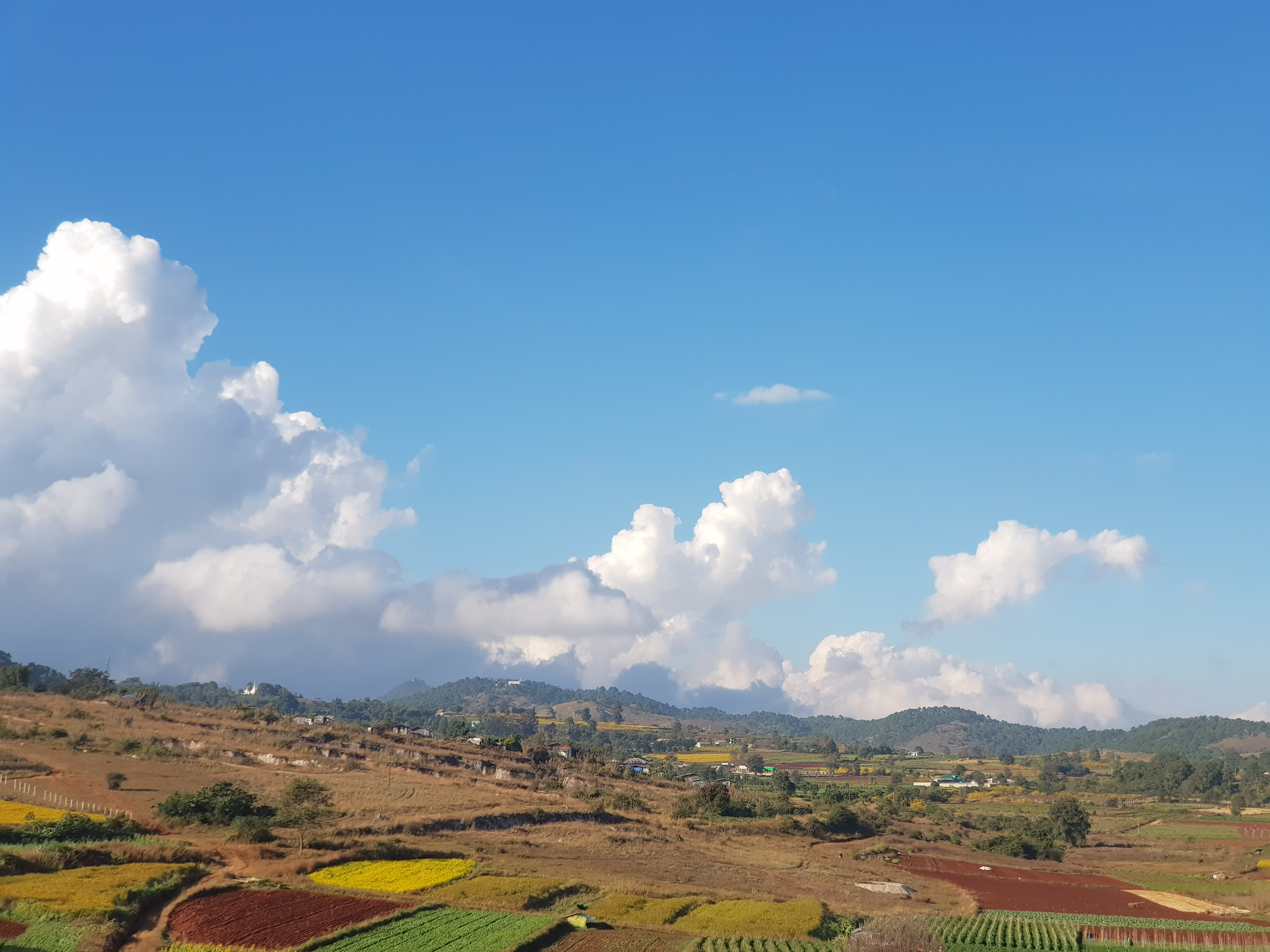
- View near Kyauktan, Kalaw Township

- Location in Kalaw district
- Coordinates: 20.669°N 96.610°E
- Country: Myanmar
- Region: Shan State
- District: Kalaw District
- Capital: Kalaw
- Time zone: UTC+6:30 (MMT)

Kalaw Township (Burmese: ကလောမြို့နယ်) is the capital township of Kalaw District in southwestern Shan State, eastern Myanmar. The principal town is Kalaw. This township contains Kalaw, Aungban and Heho.
