= Inle Lake =

Freshwater lake in Burma

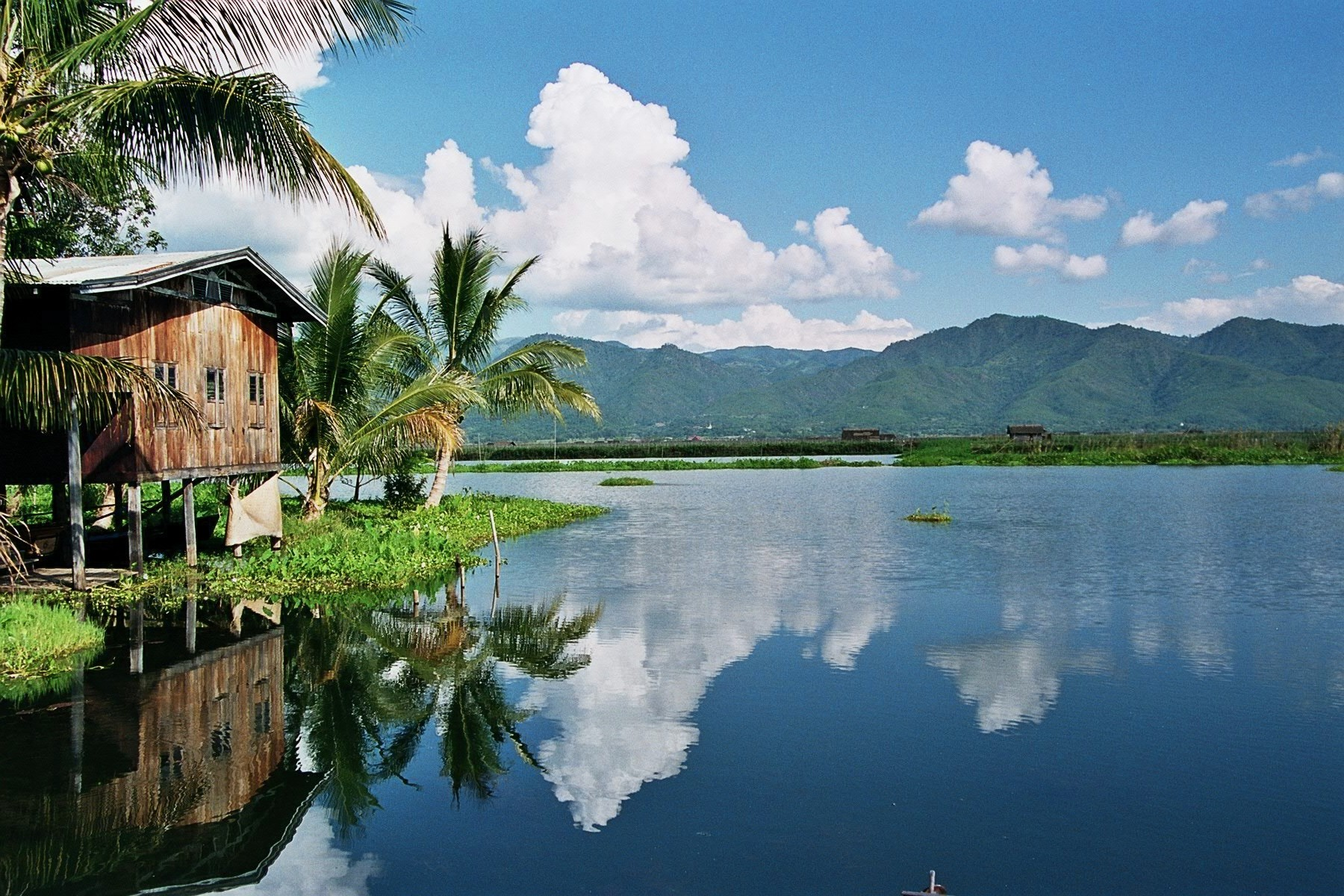
- Stilt house and floating garden bed at Inle Lake

- Location within Myanmar
- Location: Shan State
- Coordinates: 20°33′N 96°55′E
- Type: Polymictic lake
- Primary outflows: Nam Pilu
- Basin countries: Myanmar
- Surface area: 44.9 sq mi (116 km^{2})
- Average depth: 5 ft (1.5 m) (dry season)
- Max. depth: 12 ft (3.7 m) (dry season; +5 ft in monsoon season)
- Surface elevation: 2,900 ft (880 m)

Ramsar Wetland
- Official name: Inlay Lake Ramsar Site
- Designated: 5 December 1974
- Reference no.: 2356

Location of Inle Lake

Inle Lake (Burmese: အင်းလေးကန်, MLCTS: ang: le: kan, [ʔɪ́ɰ̃lé kàɰ̃]) is a freshwater lake located in the Nyaungshwe Township of Shan State, part of Shan Hills in Myanmar (Burma). It is the second largest lake in Myanmar, with an estimated surface area of 44.9 square miles (116 km^{2}), and one of the country's highest, at an elevation of 2,900 feet (880 m). During the dry season, the average water depth is 7 feet (2.1 m), with the deepest point being 12 feet (3.7 m). During the rainy season, this can increase by 5 feet (1.5 m).

The watershed area for the lake lies to a large extent to the north and west of the lake. The lake drains through the Nam Pilu or Balu Chaung on its southern end. There is also a hot spring on its northwestern shore.

Large sections of the lake are covered by floating plants. Its clear and slightly alkaline waters (pH 7.8–8) are home to a diverse fauna and many species found nowhere else in the world (endemics). There are more than 35 native species of fish, including 17 endemics. Some of these, notably the Sawbwa barb, red dwarf rasbora, emerald dwarf rasbora, Lake Inle danio, Inle loach and the Inle snakehead, are of minor commercial importance for the aquarium trade. Several fish that are not native have been introduced. Additionally, the lake is home to about 45 species of freshwater snails, 30 of them endemic, along with a small endemic freshwater crab, Inlethelphusa acanthica. It hosts approximately 20,000 migratory gulls from November to January.

In June 2015, it became Myanmar's first designated place of World Network of Biosphere Reserves. It was one of 20 places added at the UNESCO's 27th Man and the Biosphere (MAB) International Coordinating Council (ICC) meeting. Since 2018 it has been designated as a protected Ramsar site. Today the lake's environment is under serious pressure due to pollution, siltation, eutrophication, overfishing and introduced species, including the highly invasive water hyacinth. The endemic predatory fish Systomus compressiformis might already be extinct.

The climate is tropical monsoon with variable seasons (dry from November to February, hot from March to May, rainy season from June to October).

== People and culture ==
The people of Inle Lake (see Intha) live in four cities bordering the lake, in numerous small villages along the lake's shores, and on the lake itself. The entire lake area is in Nyaung Shwe township. The population consists predominantly of Intha, with a mix of other Shan, Taungyo, Pa-O (Taungthu), Danu, Kayah, Danaw and Bamar ethnicities. Most are devout Buddhists and live in simple houses of wood and woven bamboo on stilts; they are largely self-sufficient farmers.

Transportation on the lake is traditionally by small boats, or by somewhat larger boats fitted with single-cylinder inboard diesel engines. Local fishermen are known for practicing a distinctive rowing style which involves standing at the stern on one leg and wrapping the other leg around the oar. This unique style evolved out of necessity as the lake is covered by reeds and floating plants, making it difficult to see above them while sitting. Standing provides the rower with a view beyond the reeds. However, the leg rowing style is only practiced by men. Women row in the customary style, using the oar with their hands, sitting cross legged at the stern.

Fish caught from the lake have been a staple of the local diet. The Inle carp (Cyprinus intha, called nga hpein locally) has historically been the most abundant but today is seriously threatened. A popular local dish is htamin gyin - 'fermented' rice kneaded with fish and/or potato - served with hnapyan gyaw (lit. 'twice-fried Shan tofu'). In addition to fishing, locals grow vegetables and fruit in large gardens that float on the surface of the lake. The floating garden beds are formed by extensive manual labor. The farmers gather up lake-bottom weeds from the deeper parts of the lake, bring them back in boats and make them into floating beds in their garden areas, anchored by bamboo poles. These gardens rise and fall with changes in the water level, and so are resistant to flooding. The constant availability of nutrient-laden water results in these gardens being incredibly fertile. Rice cultivation and consumption are also significant facet of the local diet and agricultural tradition.

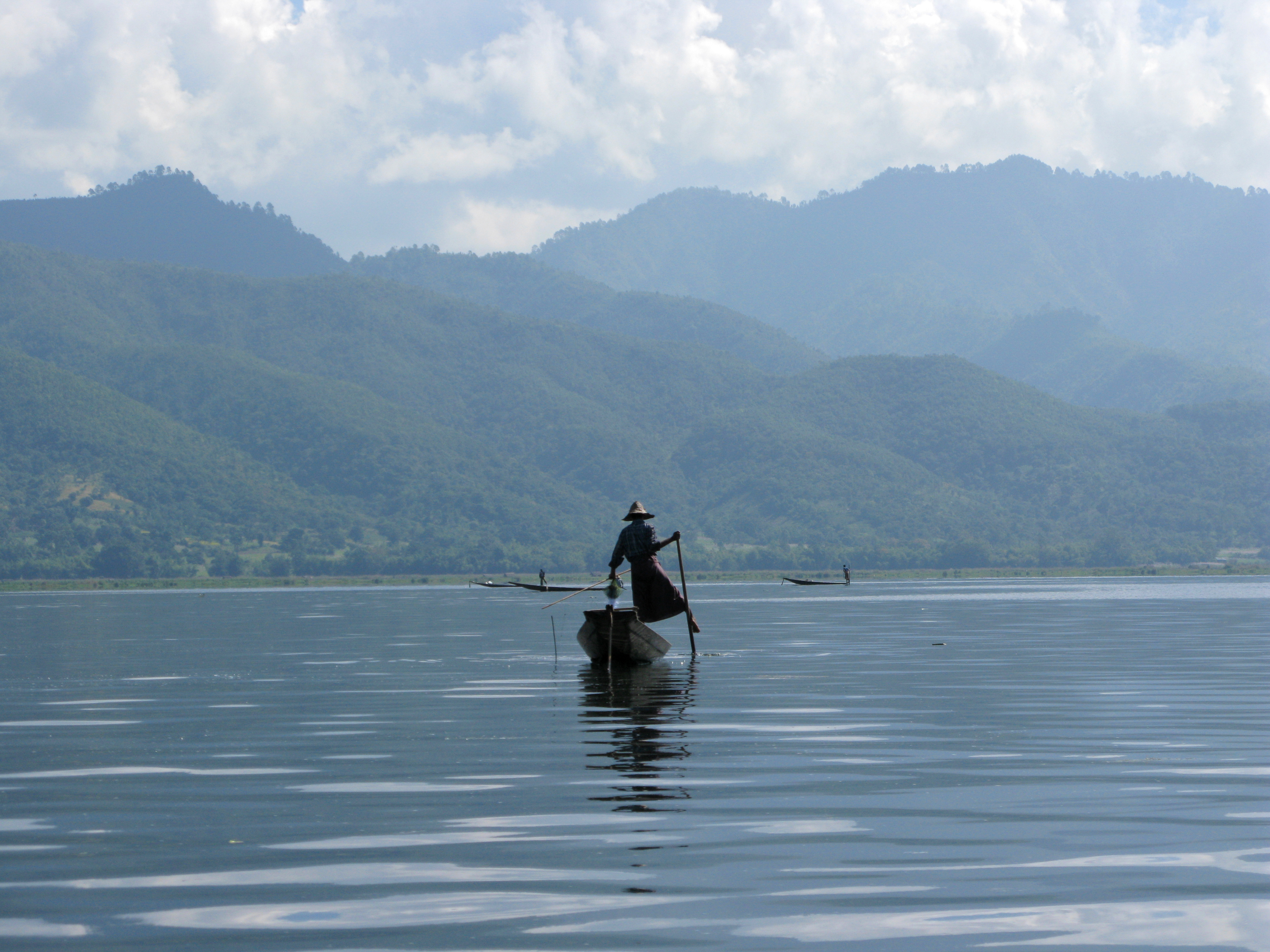
Inle Lake with its leg-rowing Intha people is a major tourist destination in Burma.

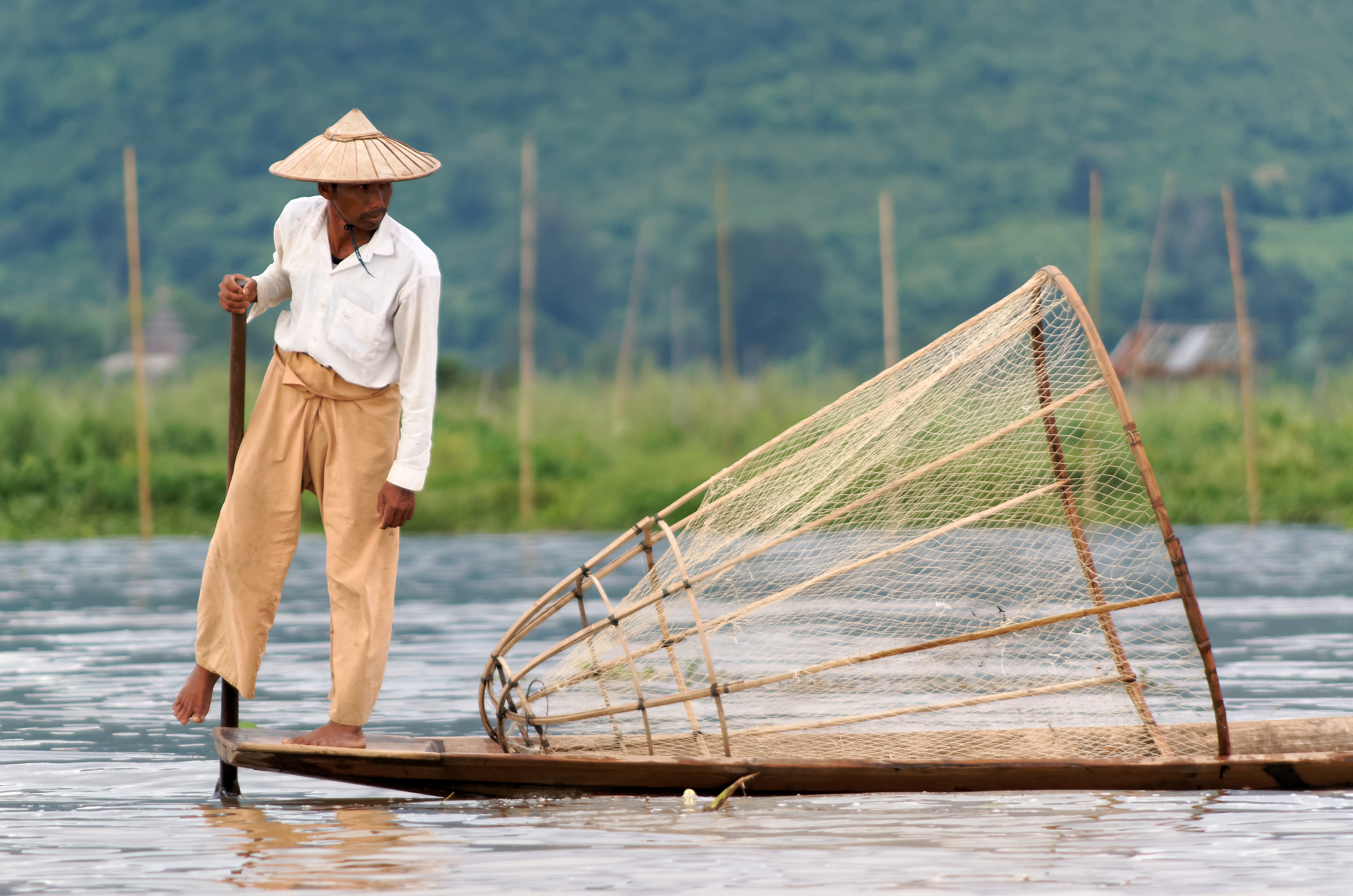
Fisherman at Inle

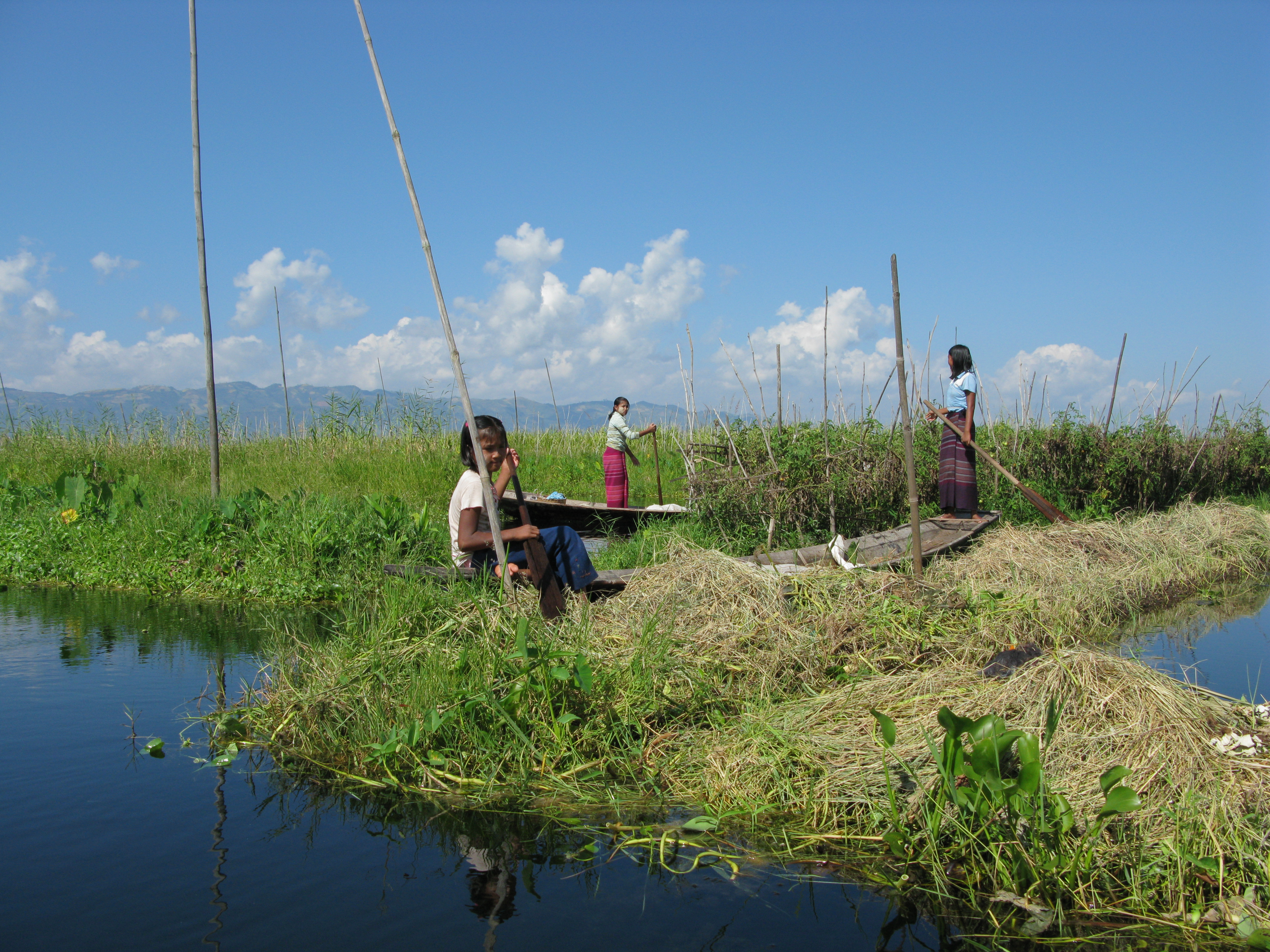
Floating gardens

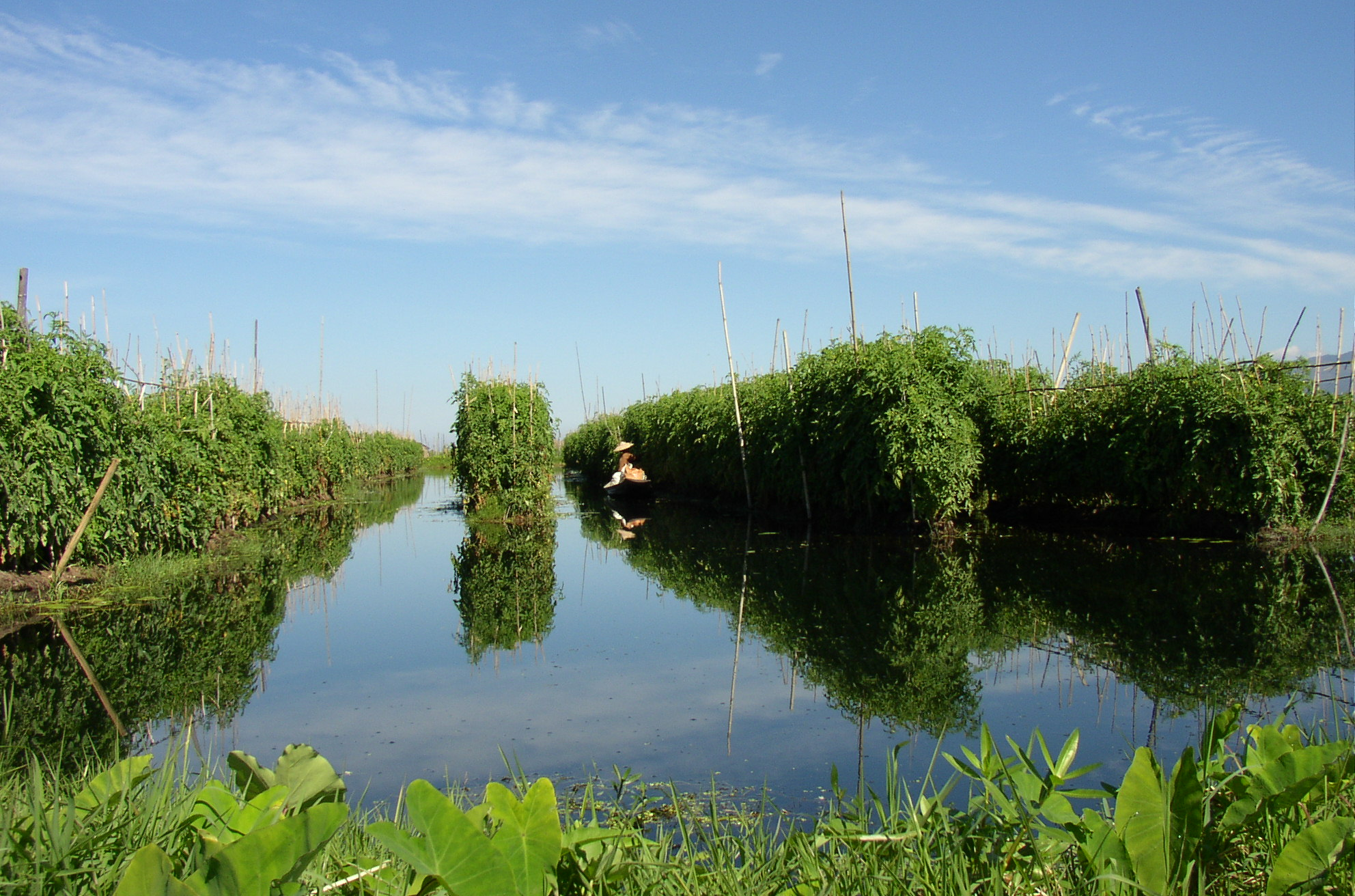
A floating tomato garden on Inle Lake

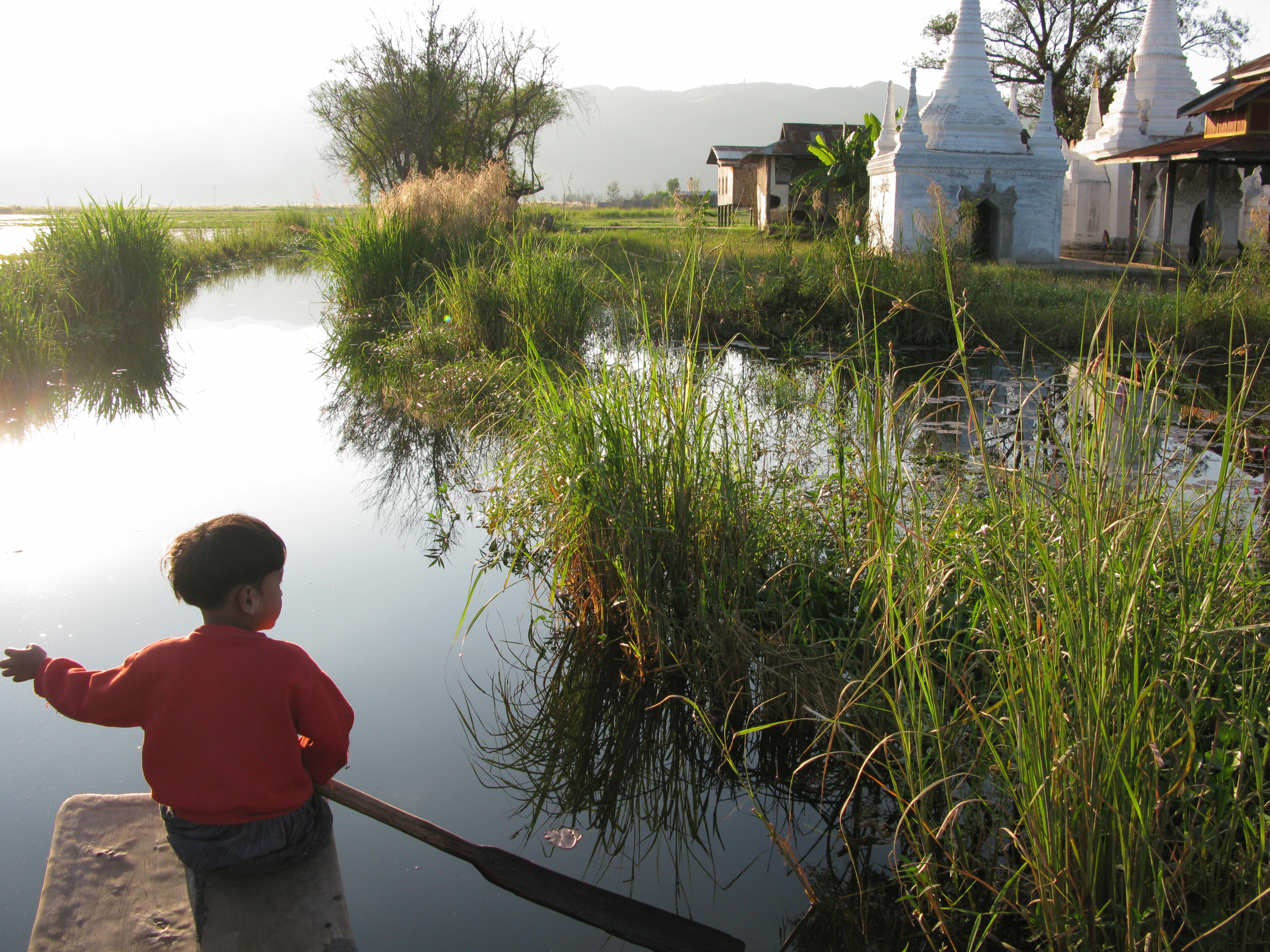
The shores of Inle Lake

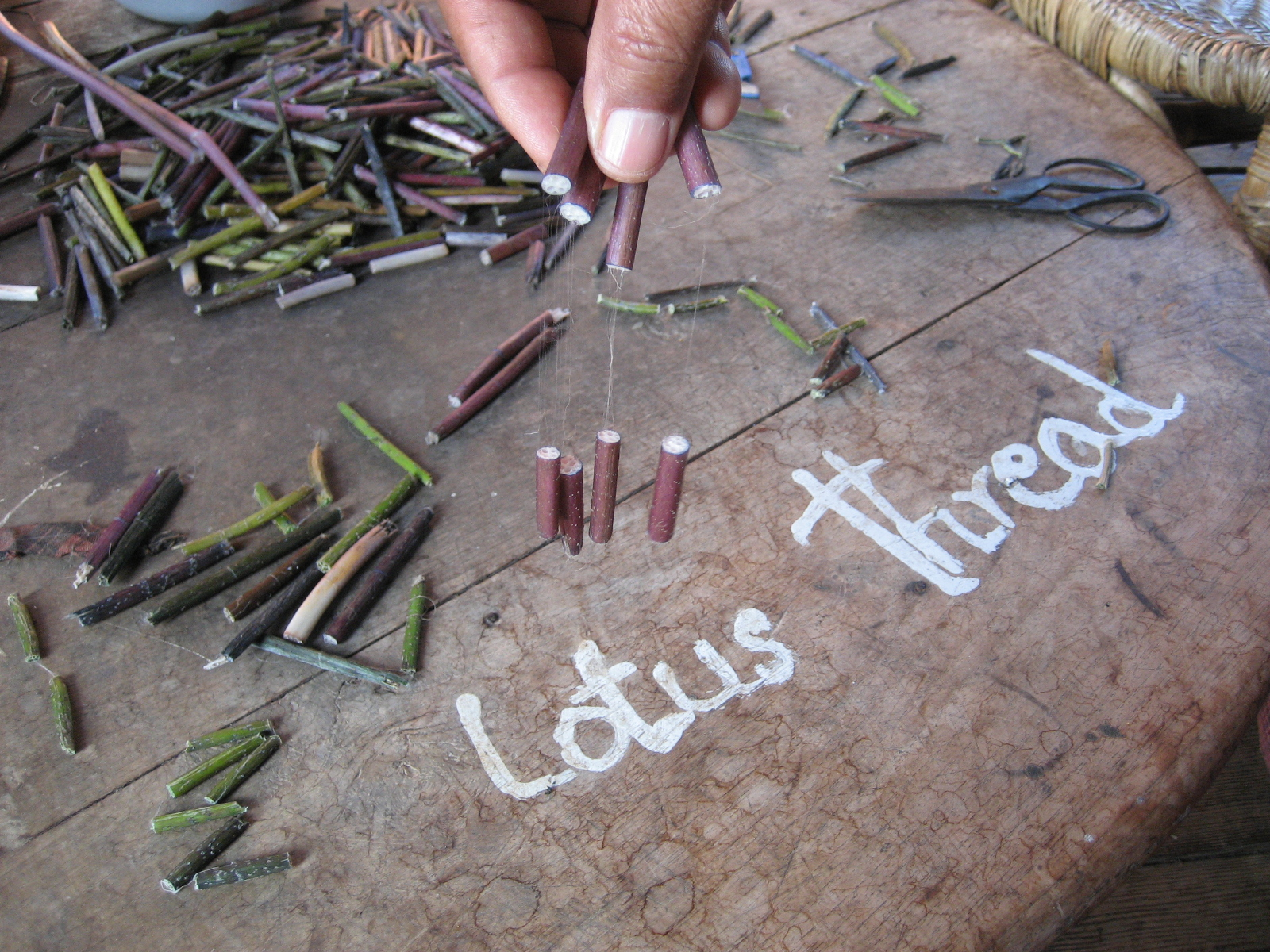
Lotus thread is used to weave a special robe for the Buddha.

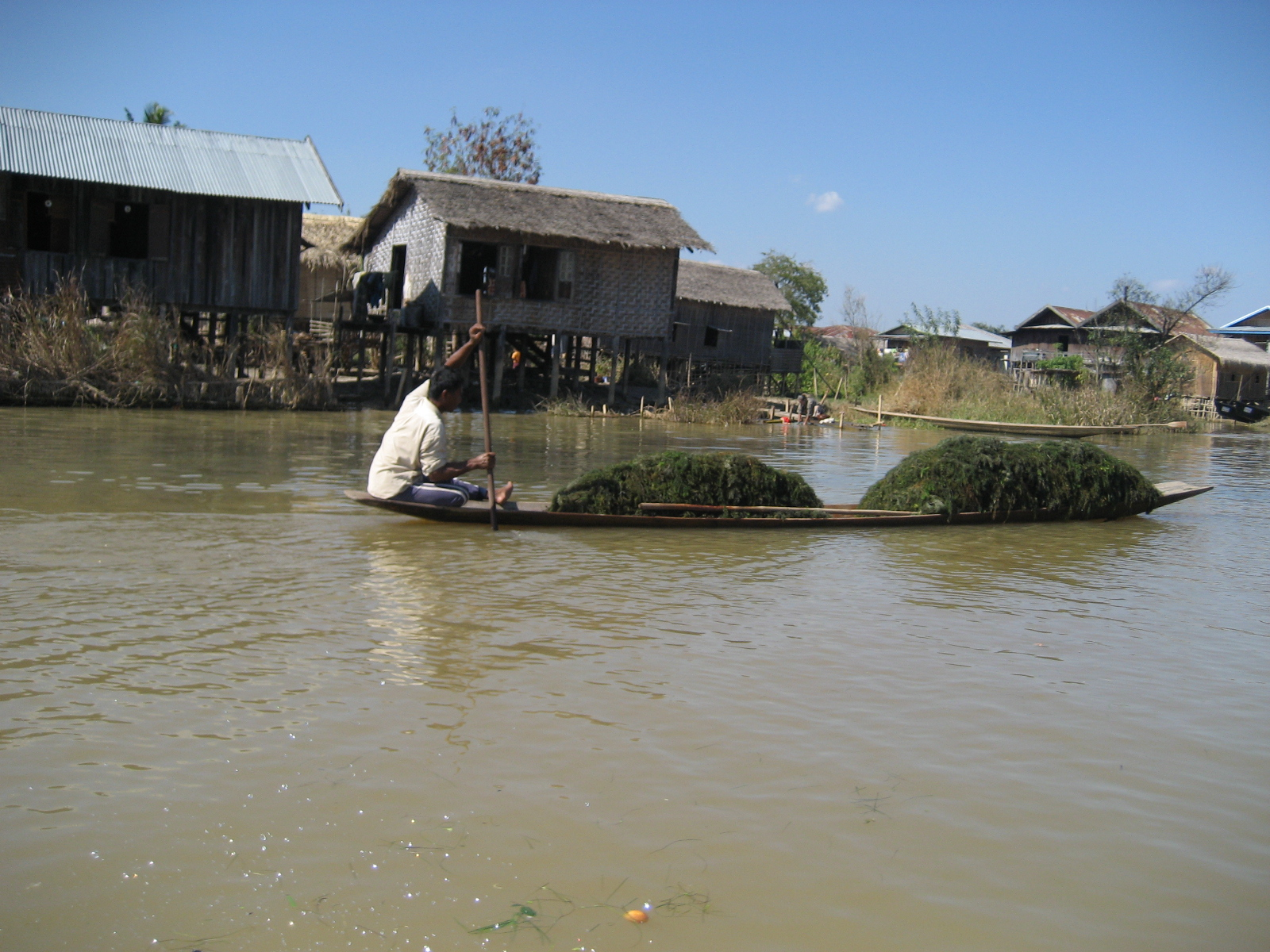
On the way home from harvesting weeds in the lake

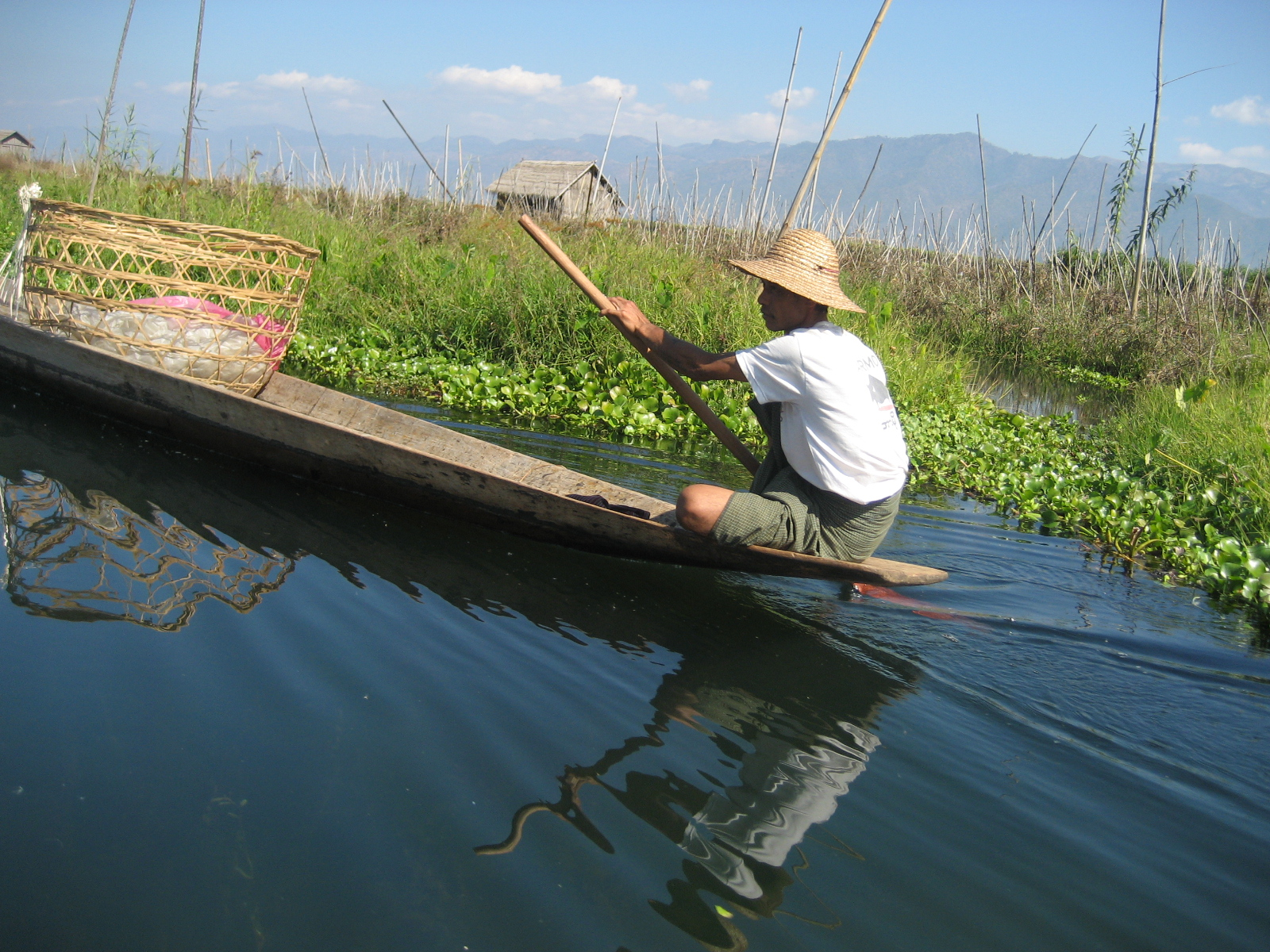
Floating farm

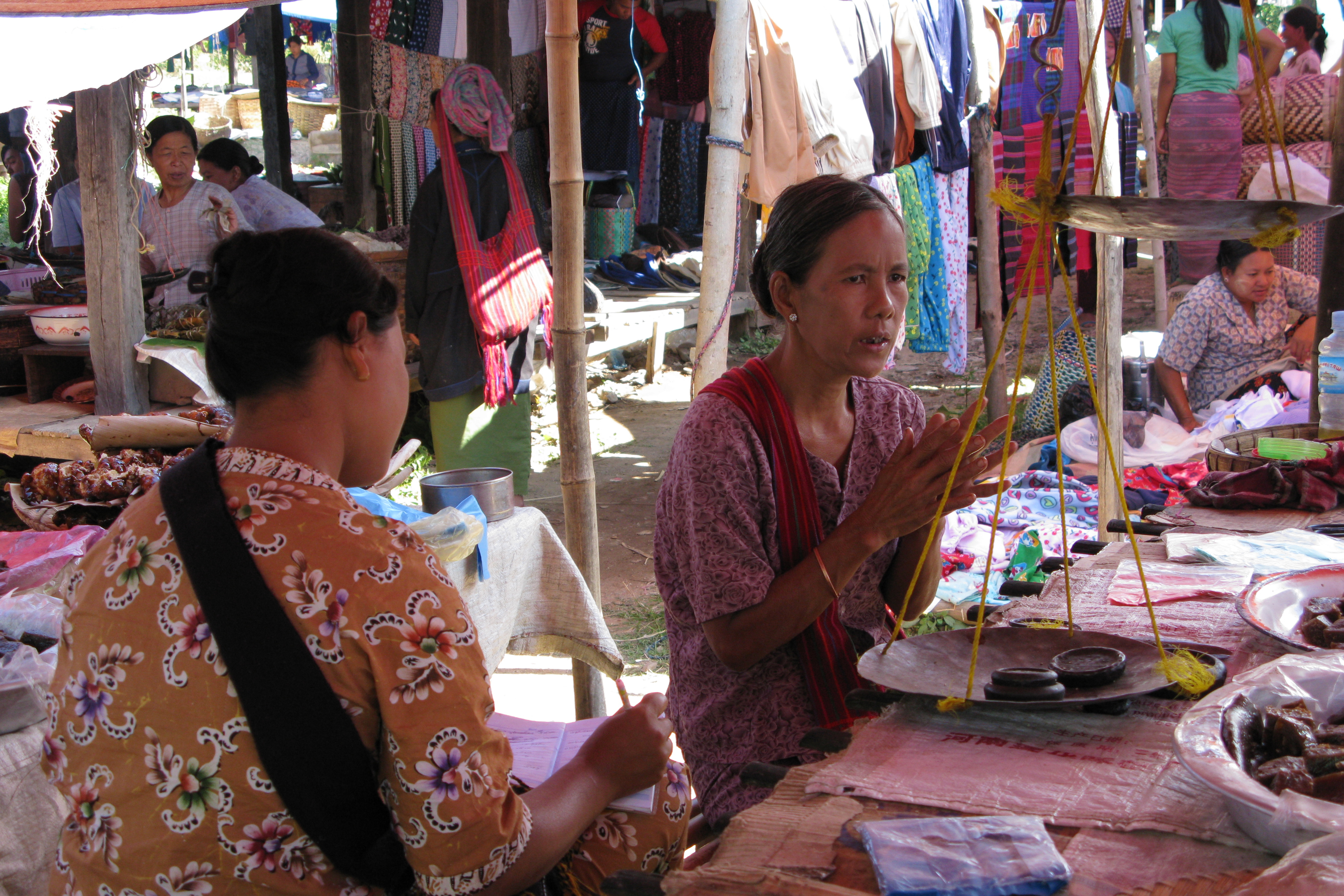
Market on the east shore of the lake

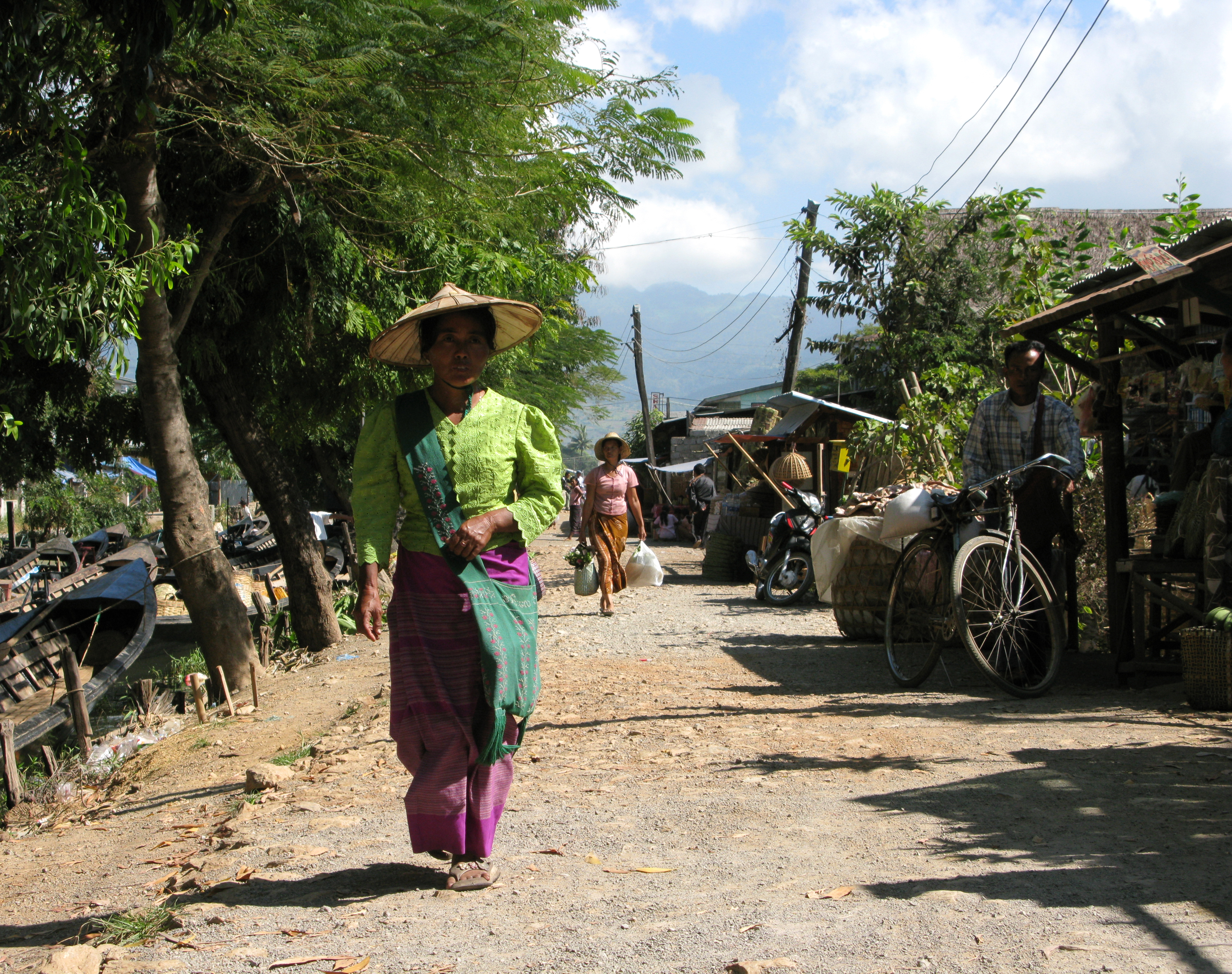
Streets of Nyaungshwe

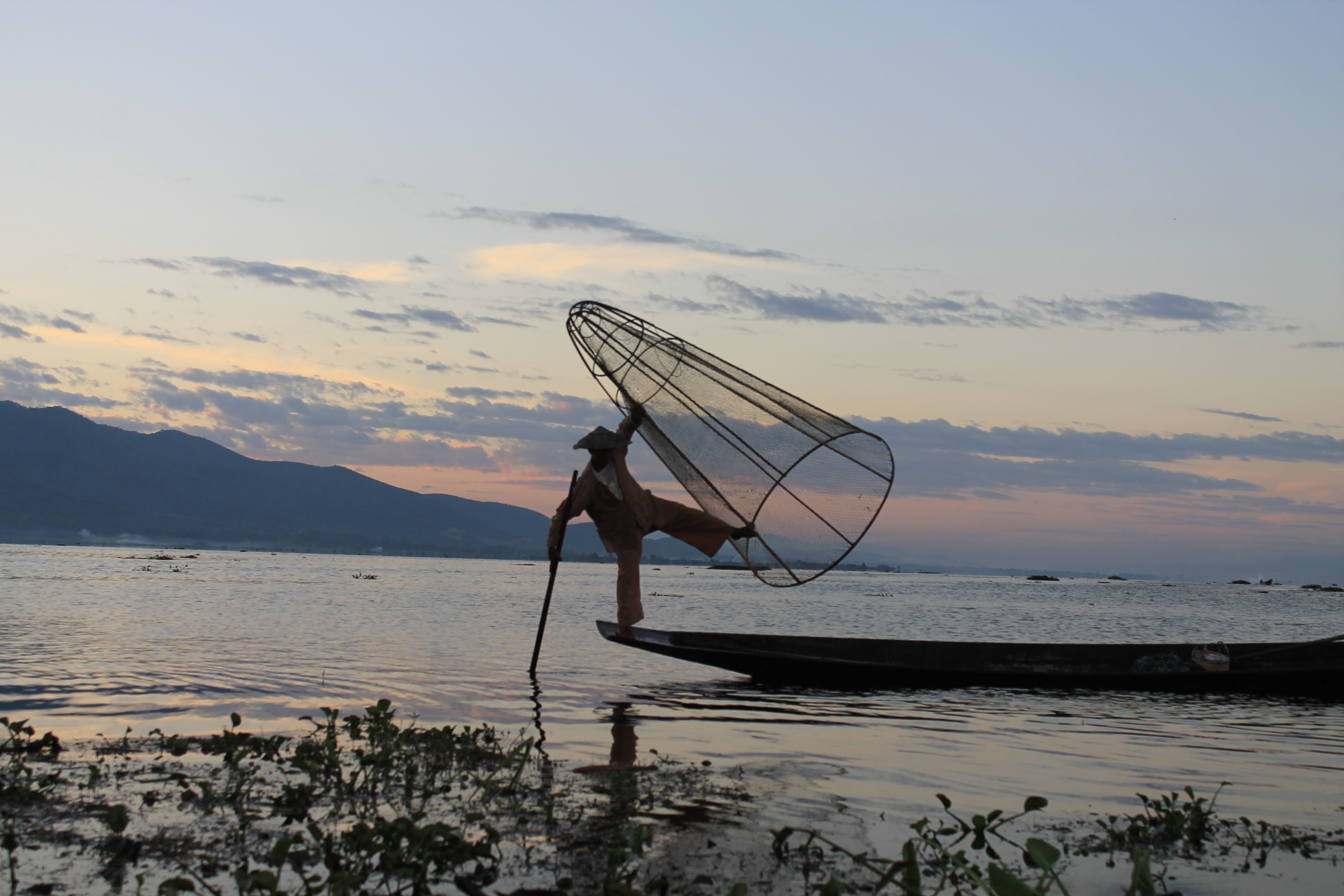
Fisherman about to drop his net

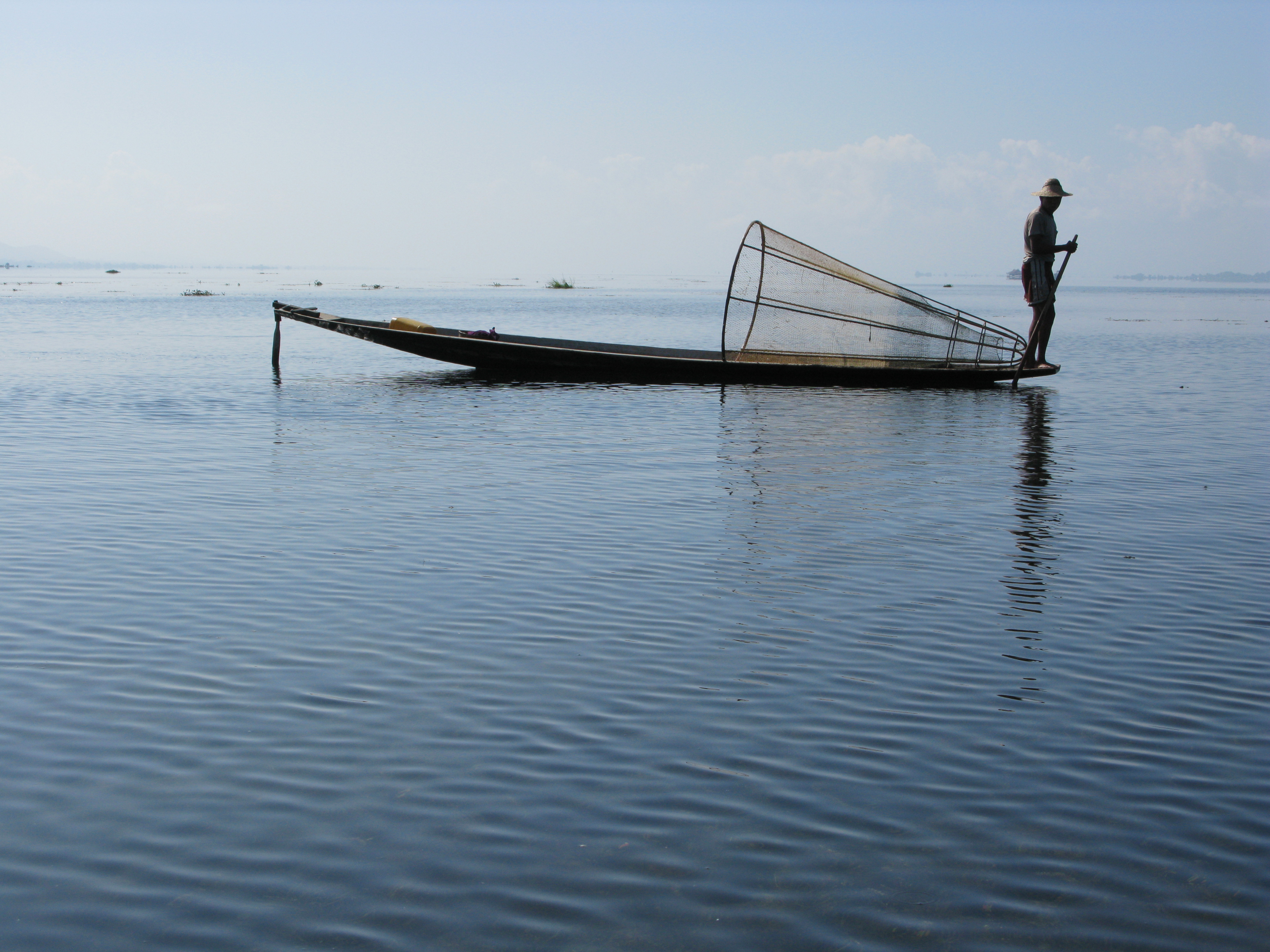

== Environmental concerns ==
Inle Lake is suffering from the environmental effects of increased population and rapid growth in both agriculture and tourism. During the 65-year period from 1935 to 2000, the net open water area of Inle Lake decreased from 69.10 square kilometres (26.68 sq mi) to 46.69 square kilometres (18.03 sq mi), a loss of 32.4%, with development of floating garden agriculture, which occurs largely on the west side of the lake (a practice introduced in the 1960s).

Lumber removal and unsustainable cultivation practices (slash and burn farming techniques) on the hills surrounding the lake are causing ever-increasing amounts of silt and nutrients to run off into the rivers that feed the lake, especially along its western and northern watershed areas. This silt fills up the lake; the nutrients encourage the growth of weeds and algae. More important however, is the development of floating garden agriculture, largely along the western side of the lake. This practice encroaches on the diminishing area of the lake, since over time, the floating beds become solid ground. About 93% – nearly 21 square kilometres (8.1 sq mi) – of the recent loss in open water area of the lake, largely along its western side, is thought to be due to this agricultural practice. Direct environmental impacts associated with these combined agricultural activities within the wetlands and surrounding hills of the lake include sedimentation, eutrophication, and pollution.

The water hyacinth, a plant not native to the lake, also poses a major problem. It grows rapidly, filling up the smaller streams and large expanses of the lake, robbing native plants and animals of nutrients and sunlight. At one time, all boats coming into Nyaung Shwe were required to bring in a specified amount of water hyacinth. Over the past twenty years, large-scale use of dredges and pumps has been employed with some success in controlling the growth of this plant. On a smaller scale, public awareness education and small-scale control have also been successful.

Another cause for concern is the planned introduction of non-native fish species, such as the Grass Carp (Ctenopharyngodon idella) intended to improve fishery.

Sanitation in the villages around the lake is an ongoing concern for public health authorities, due to untreated sewage (with 72% of households using open pits, not latrines) and waste water flowing into the lake. To ensure fresh and clean water, some villages now have enclosed wells and public access to the well water. Some studies of the lake's surface water quality indicates that the water is not safe for consumption. Water from Inle Lake has dissolved oxygen ranges lower than those necessary for fisheries and aquatic life, while nitrite, nitrate and phosphate ranges are unusually high.

Noise pollution is also a noticeable issue. The noise from the cheaper, poorly muffled diesel engines driving the stern drive propellers is significant, and can be a distraction to the otherwise tranquil lake.

The summer of 2010 registered very high temperatures causing the water level of the lake to drop so low, the lowest in nearly 50 years, that drinking water had to be fetched from elsewhere and the floating market was in danger of disappearing. One other serious consequence was that the hydroelectric plant at Lawpita, where the former capital Yangon received its power supply from, could not operate at its full capacity.

In 2015, the United Nations added Inle Lake, to its World Network Biosphere Reserves. There are a total of 651 sites in 120 countries on this network, but Inle Lake is the first biosphere reserve to be added for Myanmar.

== Tourism ==
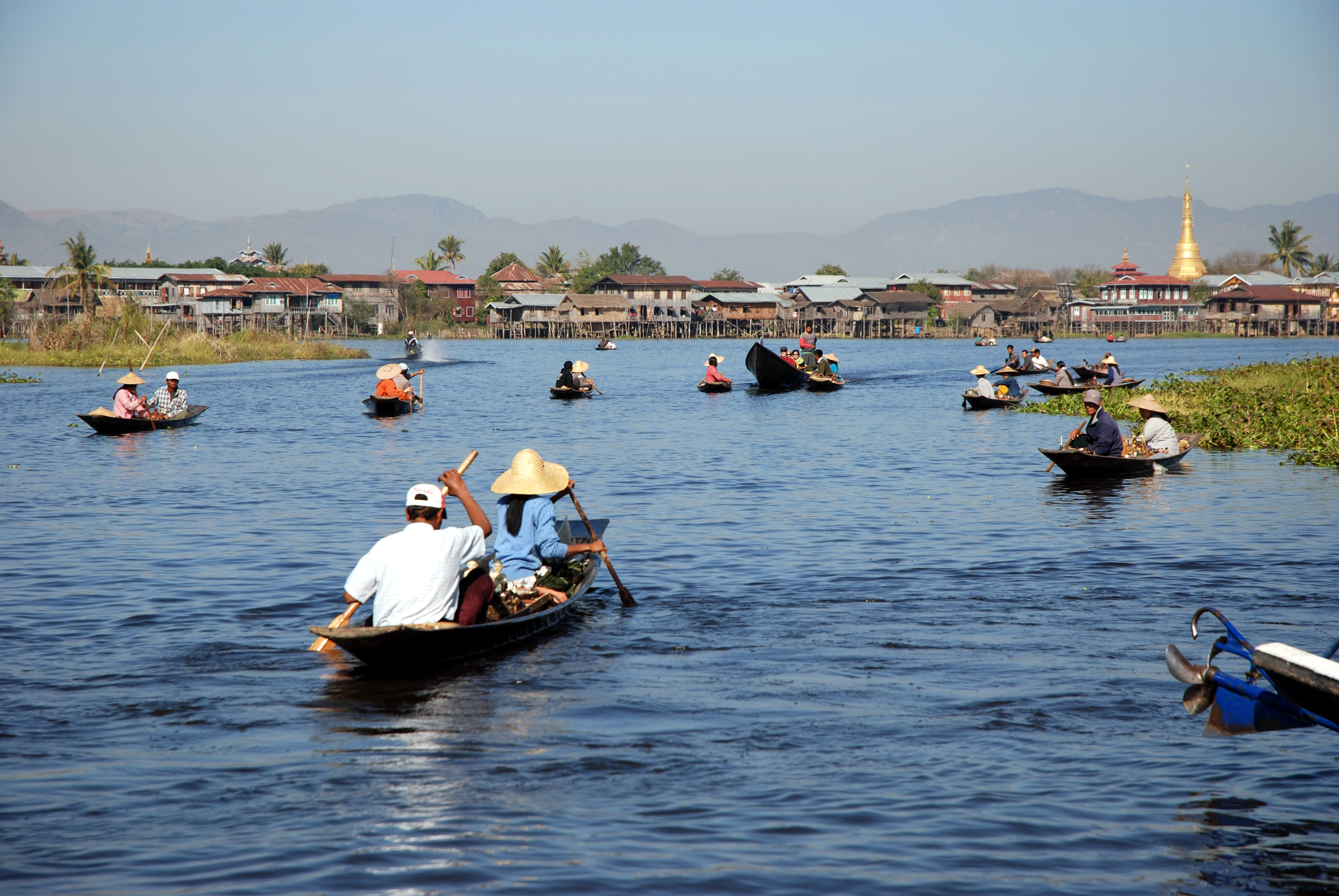
Boat carrying tourists

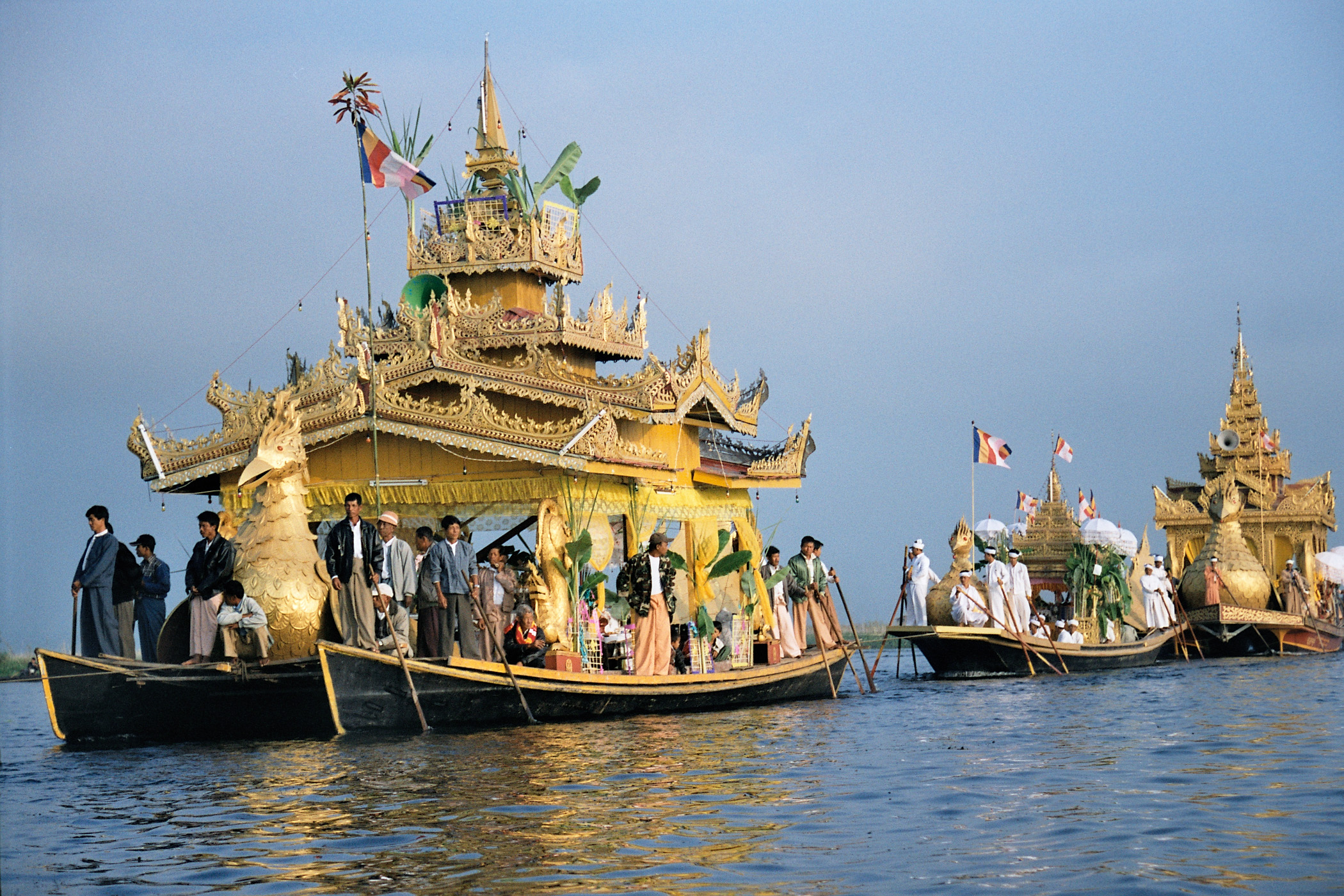
Religious event in Inle Lake

Inle Lake is a major tourist attraction, and this has led to some development of tourist infrastructure. Many small and large privately owned hotels and tour operations have arisen during the past few years. Local shops are flooded with consumer items, both local and foreign. The nearest airport is Heho Airport, which is 35 kilometres (22 mi) away. There are flights from both Yangon and Mandalay. Yangon is 660 kilometres (410 mi) away by road and Mandalay is 330 kilometres (210 mi).

A number of festivals occur from August to October on Inle Lake and in the surrounding areas. The ceremonial Hpaung Daw U Festival, which lasts for a total of 18 days, is closely followed by the Thadingyut Festival of lights. Inthas and Shan turn out in their best clothes in great numbers to celebrate the Buddhist Lent. Traditional boat racing, with dozens of leg-rowers in traditional Shan dress compete on teams with a team on each boat. These boat races are locally one of the most anticipated affairs during the Hpaung Daw U Festival.

One of the tourist attractions in the village on the lake itself is the traditional silversmithing, which has fed into the local tourist economy. The silver is brought in from the mines that line the hills surrounding the lake and is boated into the village. Almost all the houses in the village on the lake itself sit on stilts and are made of woven bamboo. Tourists can satisfy their need for trinkets and memorable tokens by observing the silver being smithed and purchasing items on-site. If silversmithing doesn't interest a visitor, there are also local silk workshops that operate on the lake in a very similar manner as the silversmiths. Handmade goods for local use and trading are another source of commerce. Typical products include tools, carvings and other ornamental objects, textiles, and cheroots. A local market serves most common shopping needs and is held daily but the location of the event rotates through five different sites around the lake area, thus each of them hosting an itinerant market every fifth day. When held on the lake itself, trading is conducted from small boats. This 'floating-market' event tends to emphasize tourist trade much more than the other four.

The Inle lake area is renowned for its weaving industry. The Shan-bags, used daily by many Burmese as a tote-bag, are produced in large quantities here. Silk-weaving is another very important industry, producing high-quality hand-woven silk fabrics of distinctive design called Inle longyi. A unique traditional fabric called lotus silk, made from the lotus plant fibers, is produced only at Inle Lake and in Cambodia and was used for weaving special robes for Buddha called kya thingan (lotus robe).

While hot air balloon flights are more popular in Bagan, they are also provided over Inle Lake with Balloons Over Bagan. There is also a winery near the lake, called Red Mountain Estate.

== See also ==
- Inlay Lake Wetland Sanctuary
