= Phaung Daw U Pagoda =

Prominent Buddhist Pagoda on Inle Lake, Myanmar

- ဖောင်တော်ဦးဘုရား
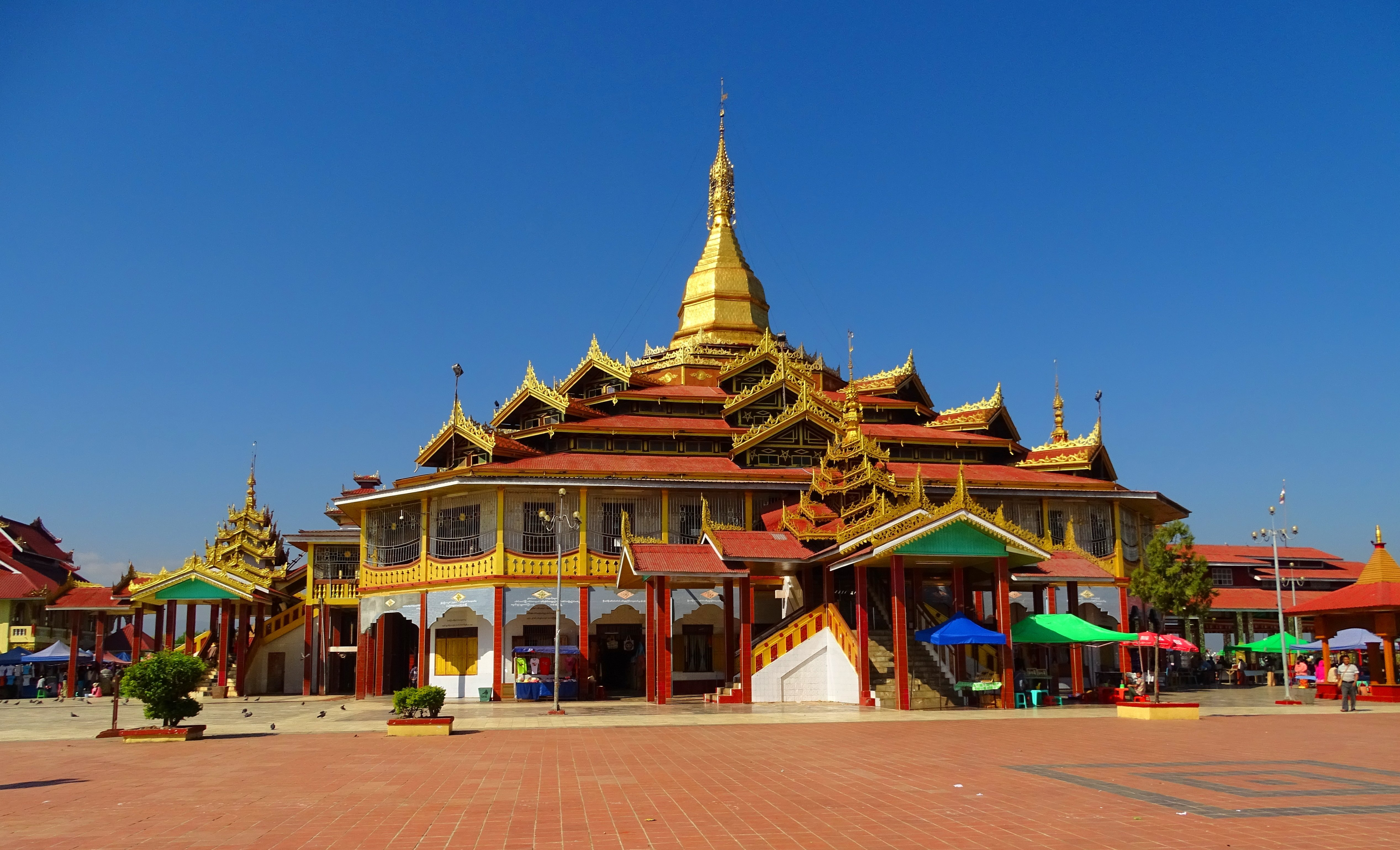
- The Phaung Daw U Pagoda

- Location within Burma

Religion
- Affiliation: Theravada Buddhism

Location
- Country: Myanmar
- Coordinates: 20°28′28″N 96°53′25″E

Architecture
- Completed: (Unknown)

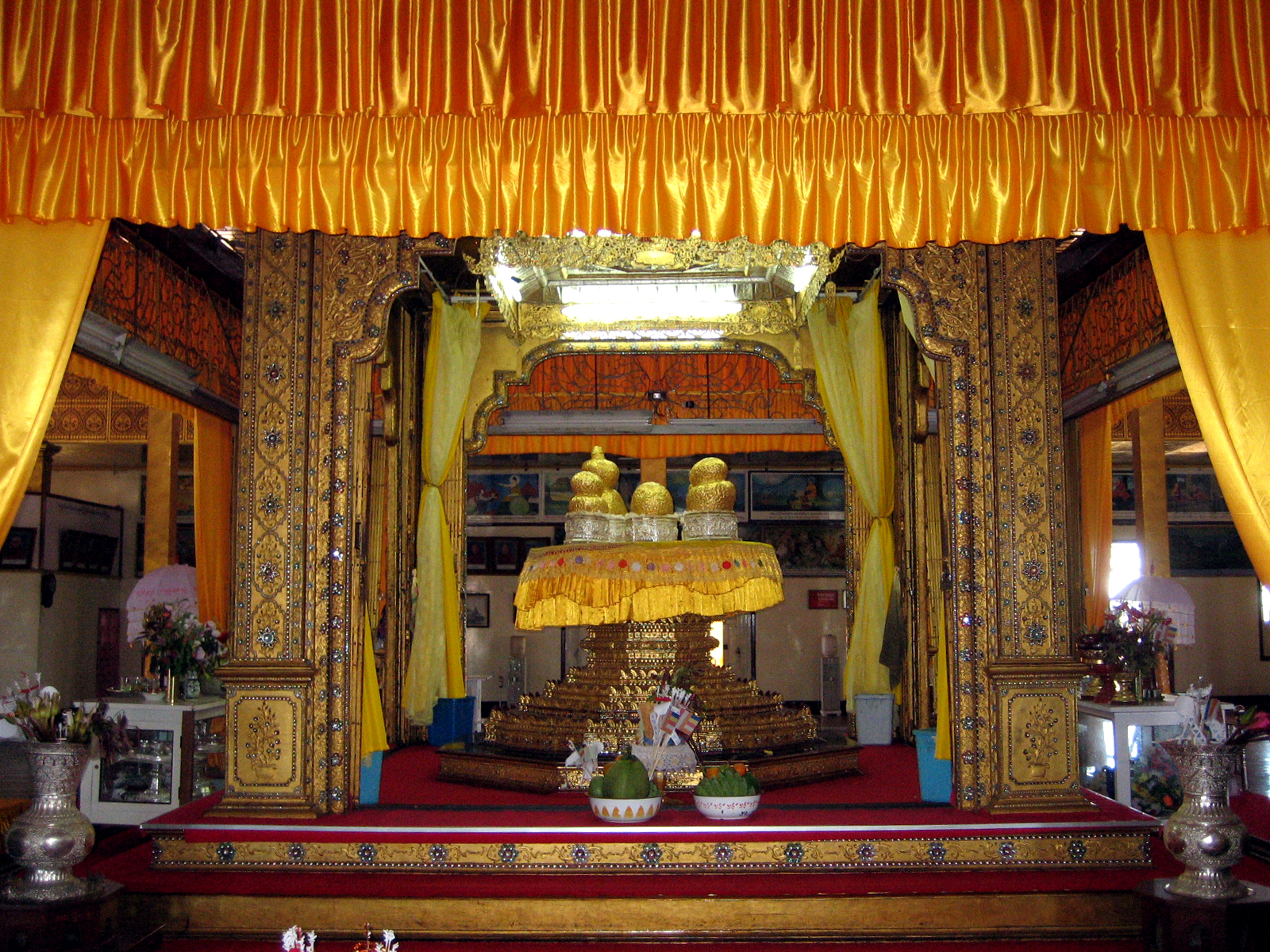
The Phaung Daw U Buddhas in the centre shrine in the main hall of the temple.

Phaung Daw U Pagoda (Burmese: ဖောင်တော်ဦးဘုရား, IPA: [pʰàʊɰ̃ dɔ̀ ʔú pʰəjá]; lit. 'principal royal barge pagoda'), also spelt Phaung Daw Oo or Hpaung Daw Oo, is a notable Buddhist pagoda in Myanmar (formerly Burma), located in the village of Ywama on Inle Lake in Shan State. The pagoda is the site of a major annual pagoda festival during which the temple's principal Buddha images are circulated on a royal barge across Inle Lake.

== Relics ==
The pagoda houses five small gilded images of Buddha, which have been covered in gold leaf to the point that their original forms cannot be seen. The images range from about 9–18 inches (230–460 mm) tall. It is believed that the Buddha images were brought to Inle Lake by King Alaungsithu of Pagan Dynasty who reigned in the 12th century.

Being essentially solid gold, the images are extremely heavy. In 2019, pagoda trustees banned pilgrims from applying more gold leaf to the statues, due to the weight of these statues and difficulties transporting them for the pagoda festival.

Old photographs hanging on the monastery walls show some of the images in a more pristine form. It is reported that some gold has been removed on occasion to reduce their mass. Before the ban on gold leaf, only men were permitted to place gold leaf on the images. Another part of the ritual for pilgrims is to place a small robe or thingan around the images, and to take the robe back to their houses and place it on their own altar as a token of respect for the Buddha and his teachings.

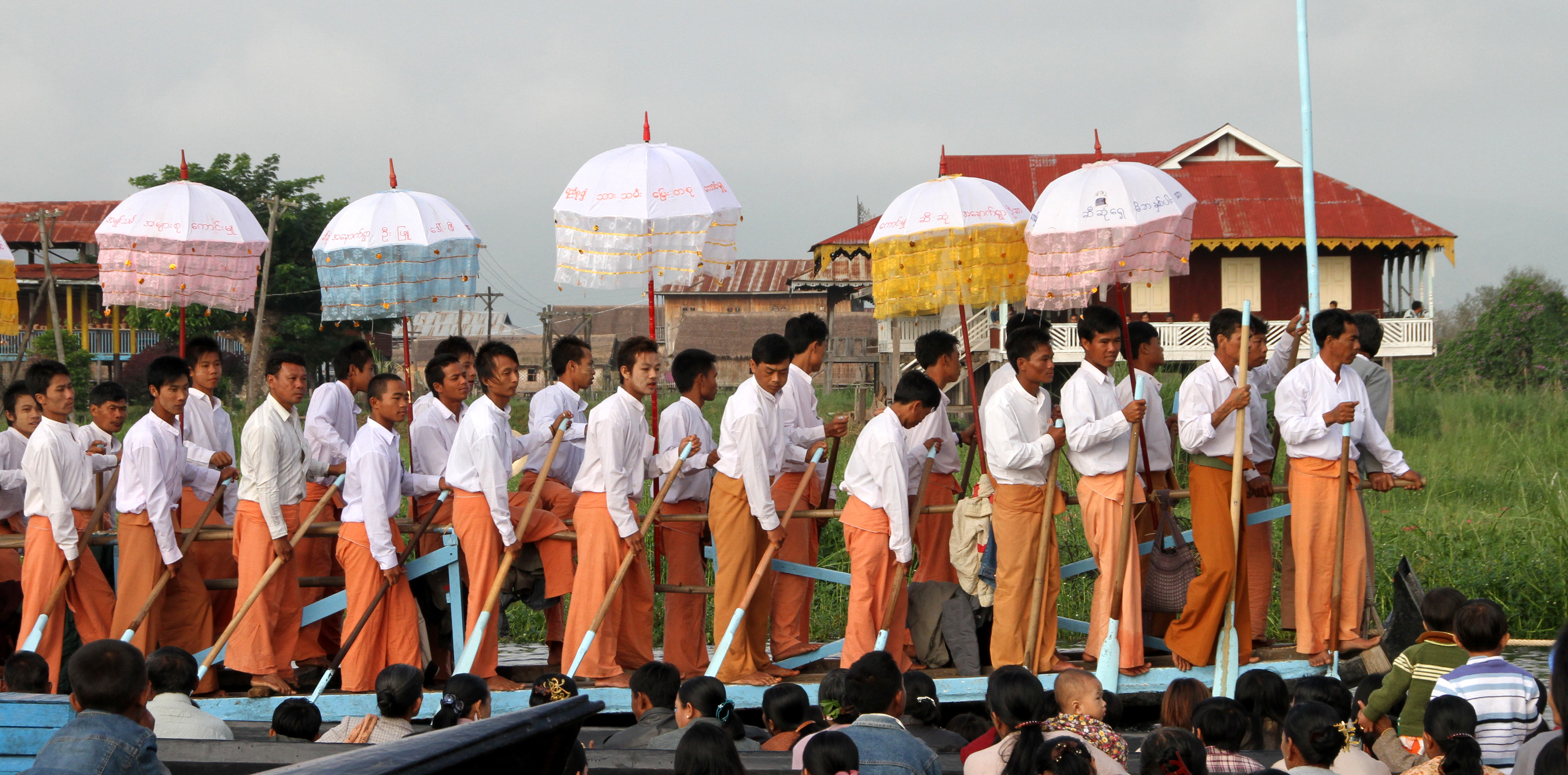
Phaung Daw U Festival

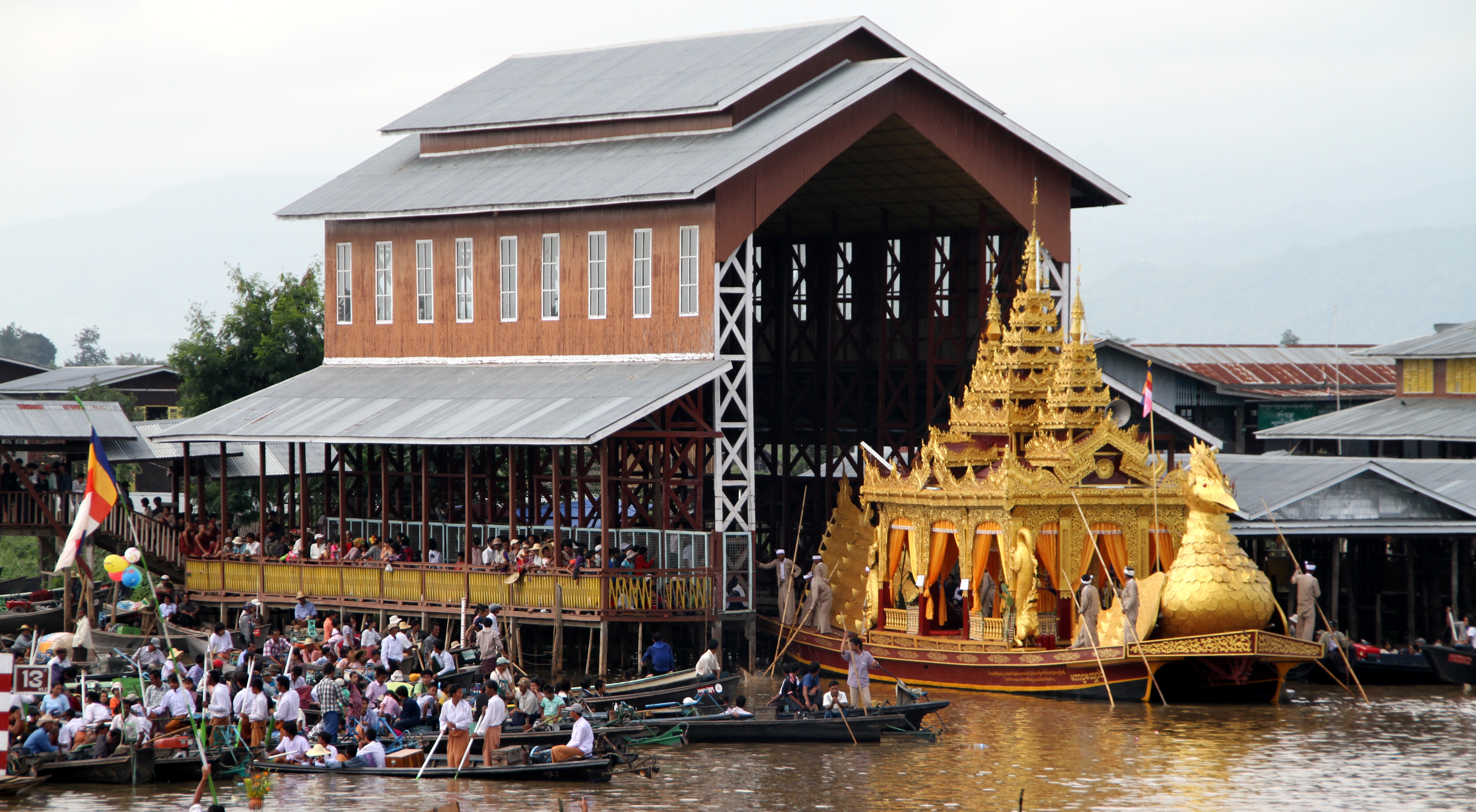
Phaung Daw U Pagoda Festival karaweik barge.

== History ==
Annually, during the Burmese month of Thadingyut (from September to October), an 18-day pagoda festival is held, during which four of the Buddha images are placed on a replica of a royal barge designed as a hintha bird and taken throughout Inle Lake. One image always remains at the temple. The elaborately decorated barge is towed by several boats of leg-rowers rowing in unison, and other accompanying boats, making an impressive procession on the water. The barge is towed from village to village along the shores of the lake in clockwise fashion, and the four images reside at the main monastery in each village for the night.

The high point of the festival is on the day when the images arrive at the main town of Nyaung Shwe, where most pilgrims from the surrounding region come to pay their respects and veneration. In the past, the Saopha of Yawnghwe would personally welcome the images. The images would be taken from the barge in a grand procession to the palace or haw of the Saopha, entering the prayer hall from the eastern entrance, where it would reside for a few hours. The public was allowed inside the prayer hall of the haw to pay their respects. Then the images would be taken to the main temple in Nyaung Shwe. Since the mid-1960s, the images have bypassed the visit to the haw and taken directly to the temple. It is now usually welcomed to Nyaung Shwe by some high-ranking official in the government.

Sometime in the 1960s during a particularly windy day, when the waves were high on the lake, the barge carrying the images capsized, and the images tumbled into the lake. It was said that they could not recover one image, but that when they went back to the monastery, the missing image was miraculously sitting in its place.

Had the lake dried up, the Buddhist people would adversely be affected.

== See also ==
- Inle Lake
- Shwe Indein Pagoda
- Yawnghwe
