= Kekku Pagodas =

Pagoda field in Taunggyi, Myanmar

- မွေတော်ကက္ကူစေတီ
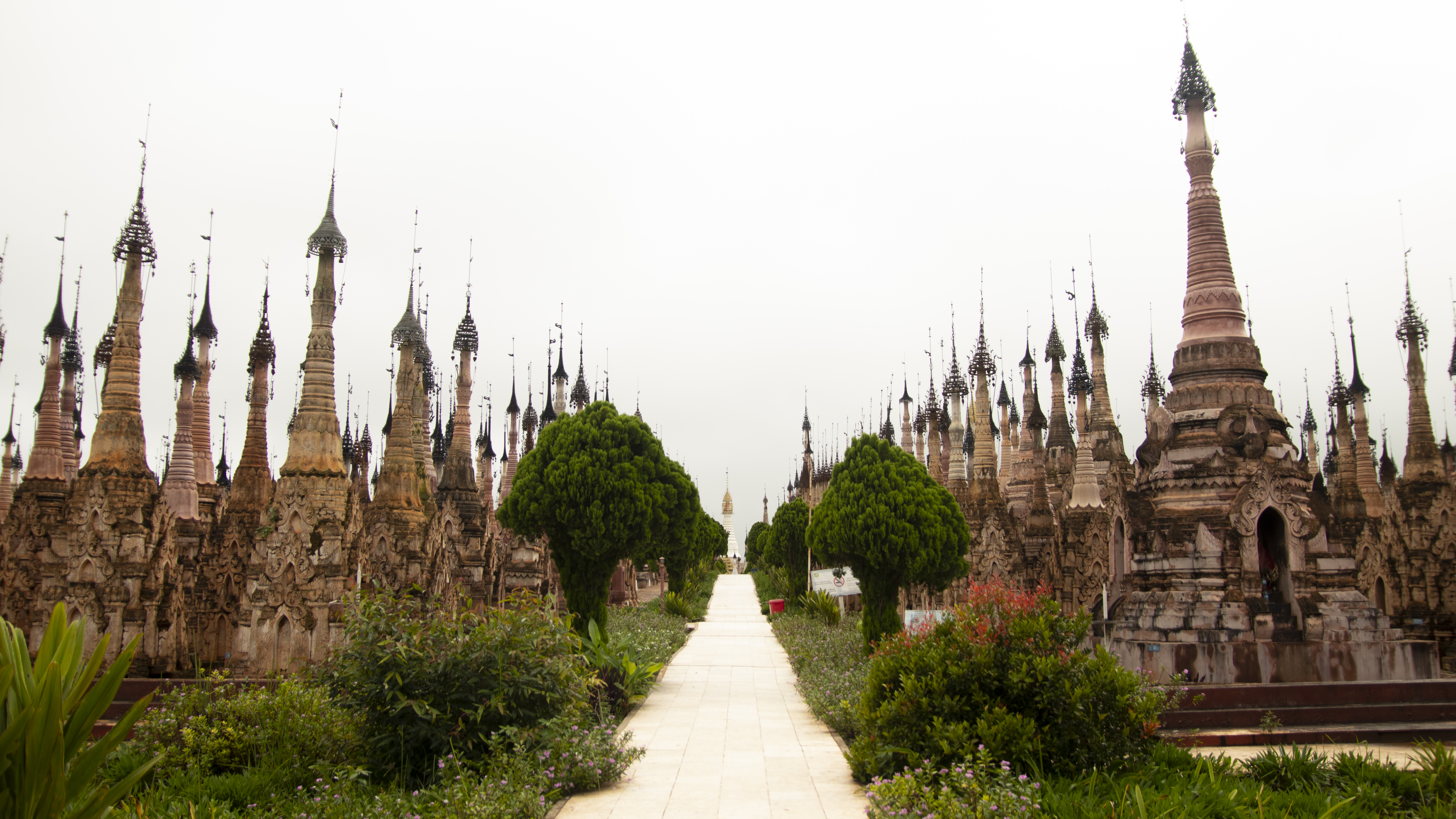

Religion
- Affiliation: Theravada Buddhism

Location
- Location: Kekku, Shan State
- Country: Myanmar
- Interactive map of Kekku Pagodas
- Coordinates: 20.445290121761115°N 97.13863657255868°E

Architecture
- Completed: c. 1100s

The Kekku Pagodas (Burmese: မွေတော်ကက္ကူစေတီ; also known as the Kakku Pagodas) are a complex of 2,478 Buddhist pagodas in the village of Kekku, near Taunggyi in Shan State, Myanmar (formerly Burma). The complex is approximately 300 by 150 metres (980 ft × 490 ft). Most of the stupas, which are arranged in the shape of the Buddha's footprint, were constructed during the 17th and 18th centuries. The largest pagoda in the complex, which stands 40 metres (130 ft) tall, was built during the reign of Alaungsithu in the 12th century. Kekku's pagoda festival is held during the full moon day of Tabaung, the last month (approximately March) of the Burmese calendar.
