= Stupas in Cambodia =

Stupas in Cambodia more often referred to as chedi (chedey, cetyi, Khmer: ចេតិយ) are steeple-shaped mausoleums holding the bones and ashes of the deceased placed throughout the grounds of a pagoda, typically found in Cambodia, usually financed by wealthier believers for themselves and their relatives. While the prang derived from the Indian shikhara prototype, the chedi felt both the Indian influence, through the prototype of the stupa, especially that of Sanchi, as well as other influences, especially with the prototype stupa of Ruwanwelisaya in Ceylan, from where Theravada Buddhism also arrived.

== Terminology ==
While the word stupa is commonly used by foreigners, the word chedi similar in Khmer (Khmer: ចេតិយ ) and Thai (Thai: เจดีย์ ) is used by locals, based on the Pali language word Cetiya with the meaning "burial mound or pyre", or Sanskrit language Chaitya from a root cita or ci meaning "heaped-up", a Sanskrit term for a mound or pedestal or "funeral pile"., also close in meaning to word stūpa comes from the Sanskrit (स्तूप) literally meaning 'heap'.

== History ==
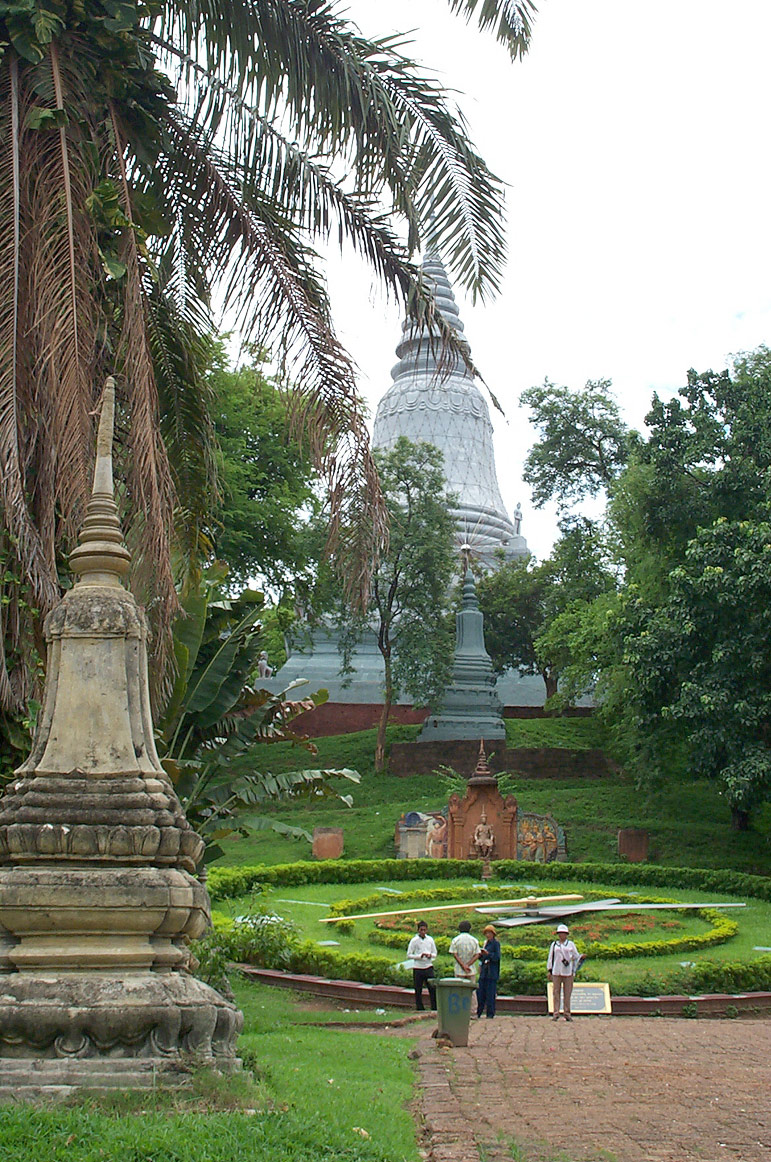
Chedi on Wat Phnom, dating from the death of King Ponhea Yat, in 1463.

The primitive chedi was merely a tumulus according to the ancient Buddhist texts and it was built to keep the ashes and relics of the Buddha only. Through centuries, the chedi developed into its current form, through assimilation with the statue of Buddha. The evolution towards chedei for individuals may be a recent one, as older monasteries, such as Wat Khnat in Siem Reap Province that has its peristyle statues of the seated buddha covering funeral urns.

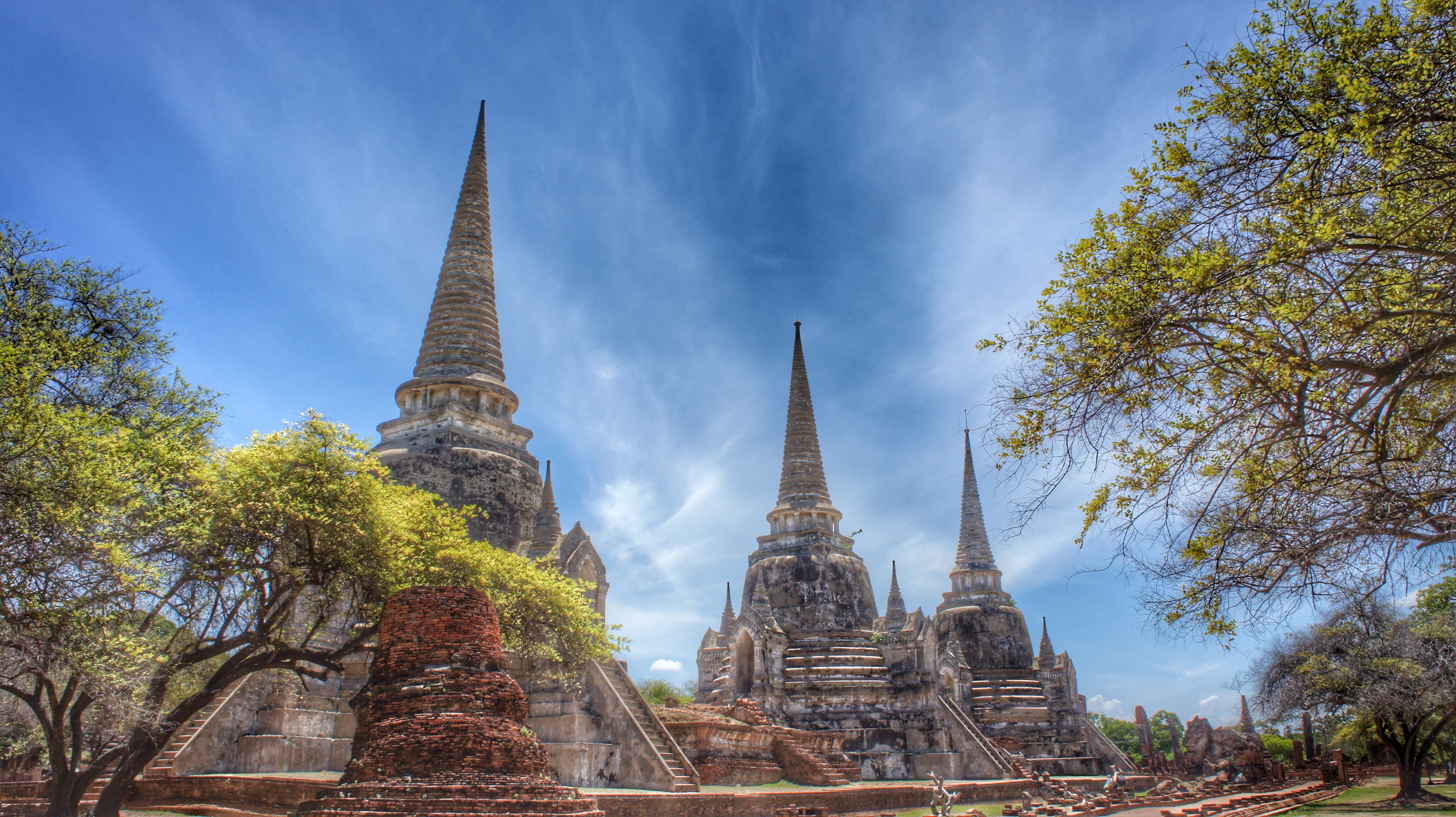
Chedi of Wat Phra Si Sanphet in Ayutthaya, in modern-day Thailand, added in 1492.

One of the oldest standing and most famous chedi in Cambodia is the one built at the top of Wat Phnom for King Ponhea Yat, his reign marking the beginning of the Chaktomuk era of the Kingdom of Kampuchea in 1431.

In the capital of the Kingdom of Ayutthaya, King Ramathibodi II added two chedi in 1492 where the ashes of his father, King Borommatrailokkanat, and his brother, King Borommaracha III were buried.

The redented chedi began to appear at Ayutthaya Kingdom in the second quarter of the 17th century following the subjugation of the Khmers by King Prasat Thong. The redented chedi is the chedi with reduced corner from the basement up to the portion of the neck of the bell-shape dome. This inspiration for new peculiar style came from the Ceylonese stupa and also the Sukhotai Kingdom chedi and Srivijaya architecture.

As can be seen especially in the area of Battambang, the chedi evolved through the influence of the Sino-Khmer who did not practise incineration, therefore creating this cell space in the chedi which tended to look more like the prang, in order to accommodate for coffins.

The stupa kept is function as reliquary, but its shape also evolved, as was the case with the monumental stupa built in front of the Royal railway station of Phnom Penh. It was built in May 1957 for the 2500th anniversary of the Buddhist era with relics of Buddhists arahants. Its cylindrical basis has doors and windows allowing it to become a place of worship on festive days.

In recent years, private chedi have increased in number and in size as a place for eternal rest, without necessarily planning long-term construction risks.

== Description ==
A typical chedi in Cambodia can be made of sandstone, laterite, brick, and more recently of cement.

Most often, the chedi are built on the northeast of the main vihear, as, according the George Cœdès, in Khmer Buddhist culture, the North-East is the direction in which an escape from our universe towards the heavens is possible. Whereas it appears that the chedi are not systematically oriented, the side of the chedi often run parallel with that of the main vihear in the pagoda, out of a desire for order and esthetics on the grounds of the pagoda.

They can have all sizes but always keep the same proportions. A chedi uses the span as it traditional measure; su much so that the base of the chedi has a span equal to that of its owner, and that if the bulb has a length of 12 spans, the plinth must have the same length too. The lower part or base and the spire are half as high with only 6 spans. The two inner terraces have a height of 5 spans. The sole under the base has a height of merely one span. The width of the chedi is 18 spans, which is three times its height of 6 spans.

The number of levels on the terasses and the tiered umbrella must always be uneven: 3, 5, 7, and 9 for the King.

The vajra is an essential element of the decoration of the chedi, and it is one of the typical remnants of Mahayana Buddhism in the majority Theravada Buddhism of South-East Asia.

== Styles ==
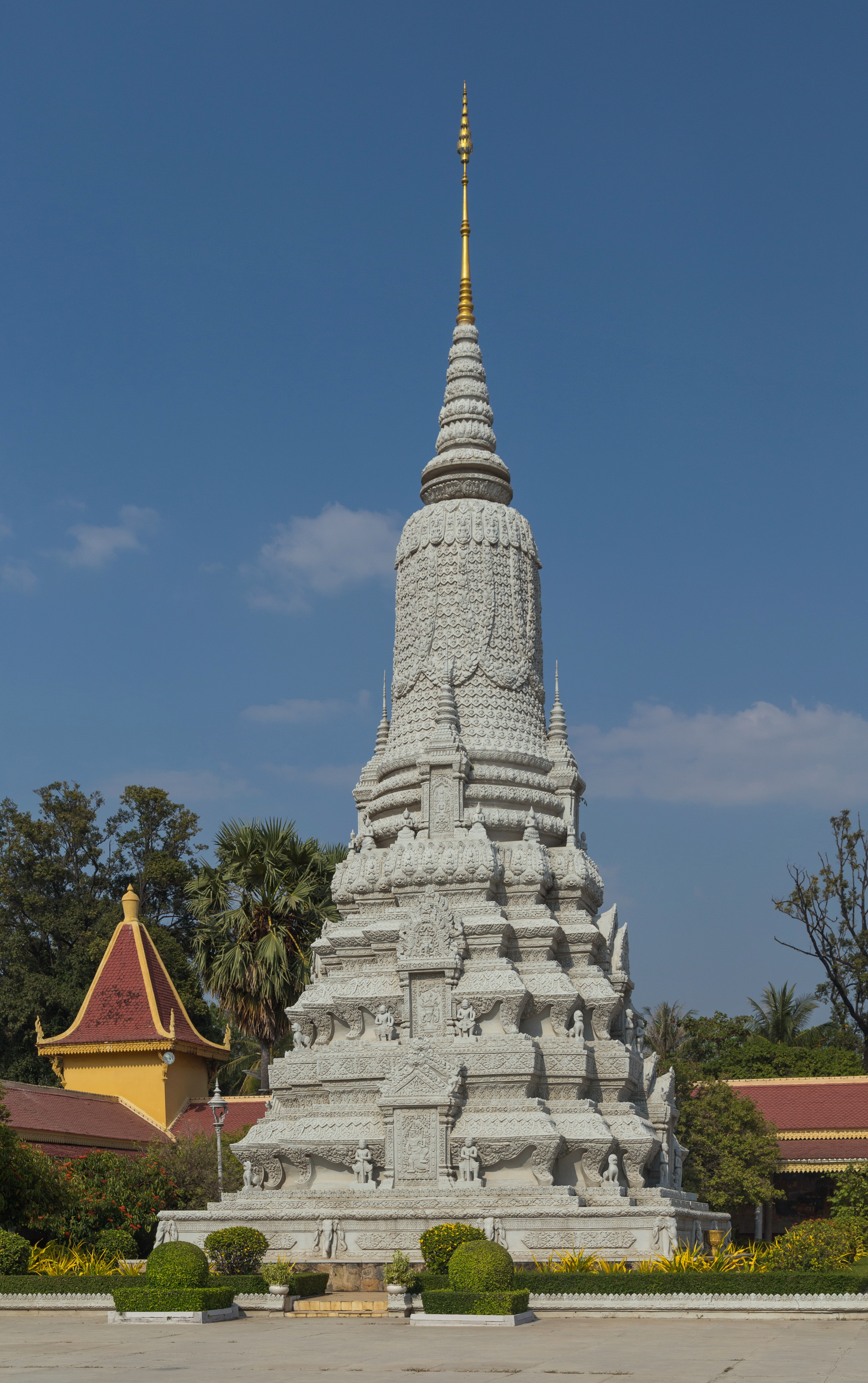
Decked chedi of King Norodom in Phnom Penh.

Chedi have been constructed in a great variety of style, which is difficult to synthesize. The chedi in Myanmar, Thailand and Cambodia were influenced in style by the round Ceylanese stupa as well as the Indian hinayana stupa of the time of Emperor Asoka. In Cambodia, according to French anthropologist, Jean-Pierre Carbonnel, three different styles of stupa can be identified as Khmer: the decked chedi, the sculpted chedi, and the simple chedi.

=== Decked chedi ===
The decked chedi which is used for the king's ashes usually has sculptures on the pediments of its five levels in the four cardinal directions. The bulb, which is considered the sacred body of the chedi, is ornate with necklace chains in such a manner that the ends cross over each other. whereas the elements at their basis may represent the four-faced Brahma.

=== Sculpted chedi ===
The sculpted chedi, used for the royal family, has neither pediment nor faces of Brahma. It may only have sculptures on the pedestal of the bulb, on its summit and the tiered umbrella.

=== Simple chedi ===
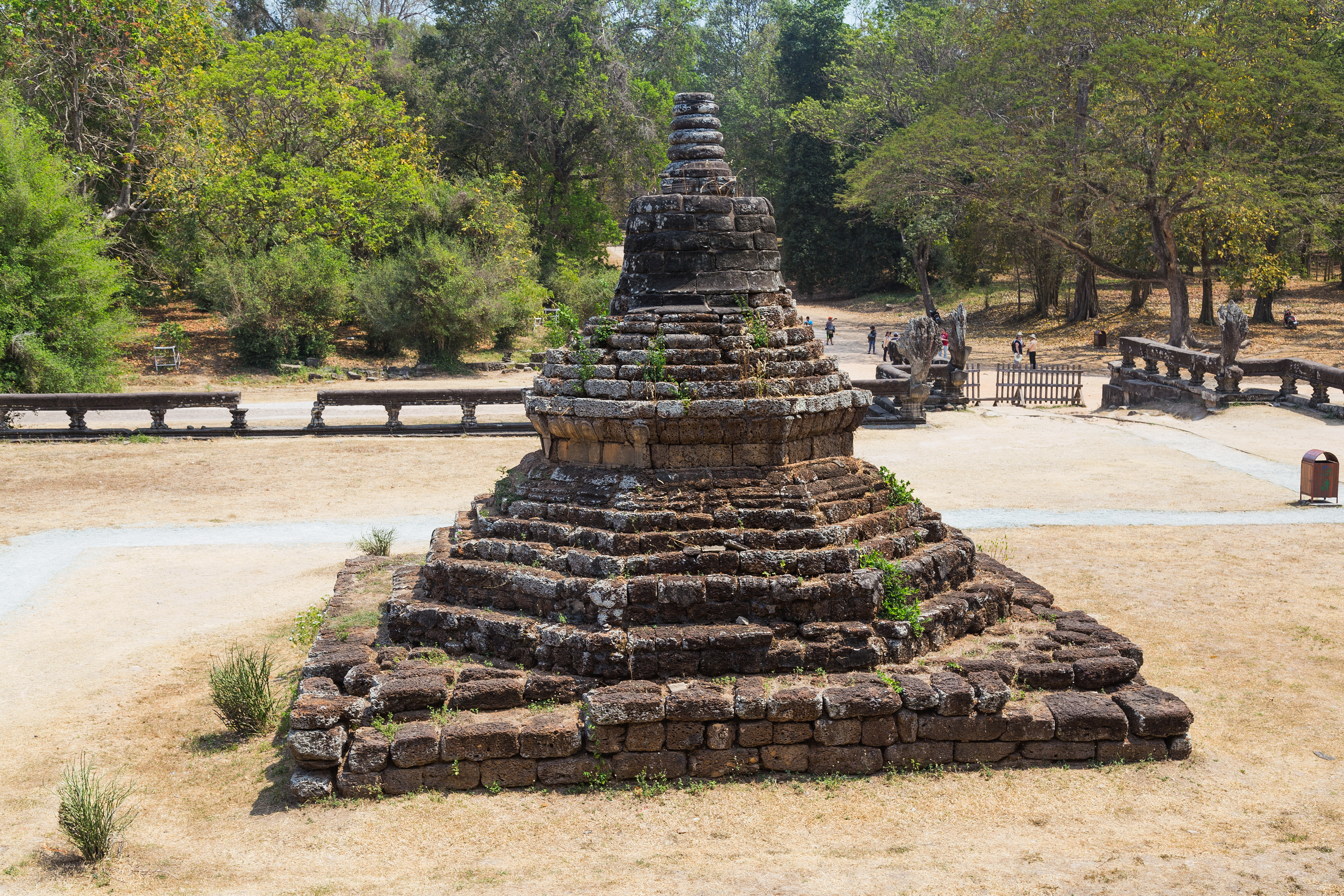
The Chey Non stupa in Angkor Wat dates from 1701.

The simple chedi is not sculpted, but, rarely, it will be decorated with a row of reversed lotus petals on the shoulder of the bulb.

== Topography ==
Khmer chedi can be found mainly in Cambodia, and have influenced stupas in Thailand as well, visible in the Khmer art of Lopbburi.

Chedi structures have been replicated by the Khmer and Thai diaspora, especially in the United States, where they can be seen at the Khemara Buddhikaram.

A chedi was built in Canada for the 'Observance and Memorial' exhibit at the Royal Ontario Museum in 2011. It was dedicated to the survivors and spirits of those lost during Cambodia's mass violence.

== Function ==
The chedi which was originally a sacred place of conversation of relics, now has a primary funerary function, to keep the remains of the defunct. It can also have a decorative function, as even the lime box for the betel have a chedi shape, and can also be built votively, as was the case in the legend of King Bayankgor who had 1000 chedi built after inadvertently committing incest with his mother. The old stupas in the pagodas often become the place where old artifacts, fragments of statues or Khmer inscriptions, corrupted palm-leaf manuscripts, are deposited rather than being burned.

== Interpretation ==
=== Assimilating the chedi with the body of the Buddha ===
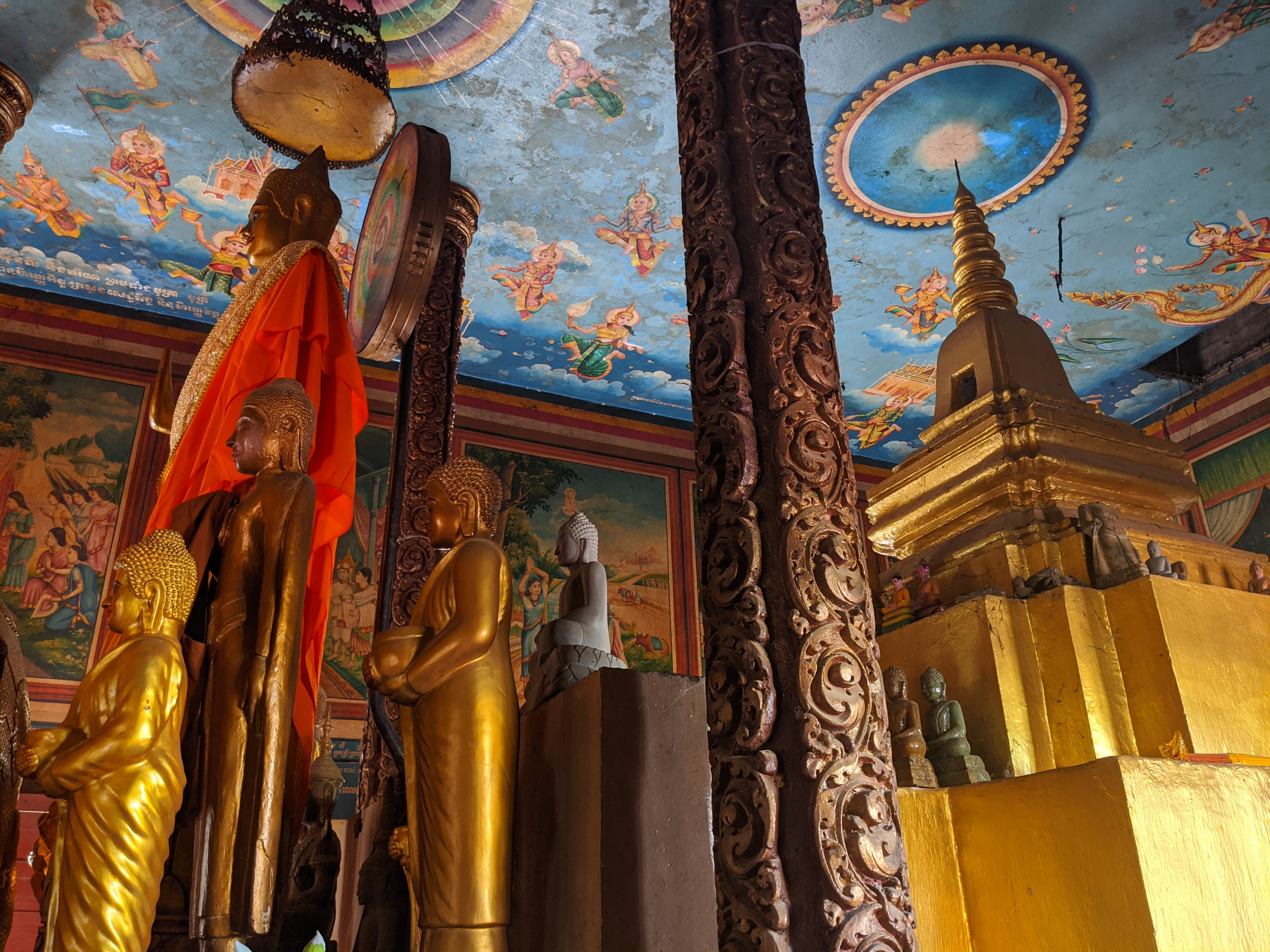
Chedi within a pagoda in Wat Vihear Suor.

Georges Groslier noticed that, in Buddhist pagodas, such as the one of Wat Vihear Suor, there could be either an altar or a chedi, concluding that both could be assimilated. For Jeannine Auboyer, the body of the Buddha is ultimately identified with the chedi. This is also indicated by the terminology used to indicate the different parts of the chedei which refer to a sacred body (Khmer: ព្រះកាយ).

=== A spirituality of ascension ===
The chedi is the synthesis of a philosophy of life, of a certain way of dying: the spire that aims for the sky indicates a certain momentum, as does the symbolism of the uneven numbers which seeks to be evened out and fulfilled.

The shape and meaning of the chedi is reminiscent of the spiers of Western cathedrals.

— J. P. Carbonnel, Le stupa cambodgien actuel

Symbolically, the structure of the chedi with its uneven number of squares inside of which is a circle allows mortal men to go from Earth, the squares, to Heaven, represented by the circle.

== Bibliography ==
- Carbonnel, Jean-Pierre (1973). "Le stūpa cambodgien actuel". Arts Asiatiques. 26 (1): 225–242. doi:10.3406/arasi.1973.1063.

== See also ==
- Burmese pagoda
- Cetiya
- Stupas in Thailand
- Stupas in Sri Lanka
