= Cetiya =

Objects and places used by Buddhists to remember Buddha

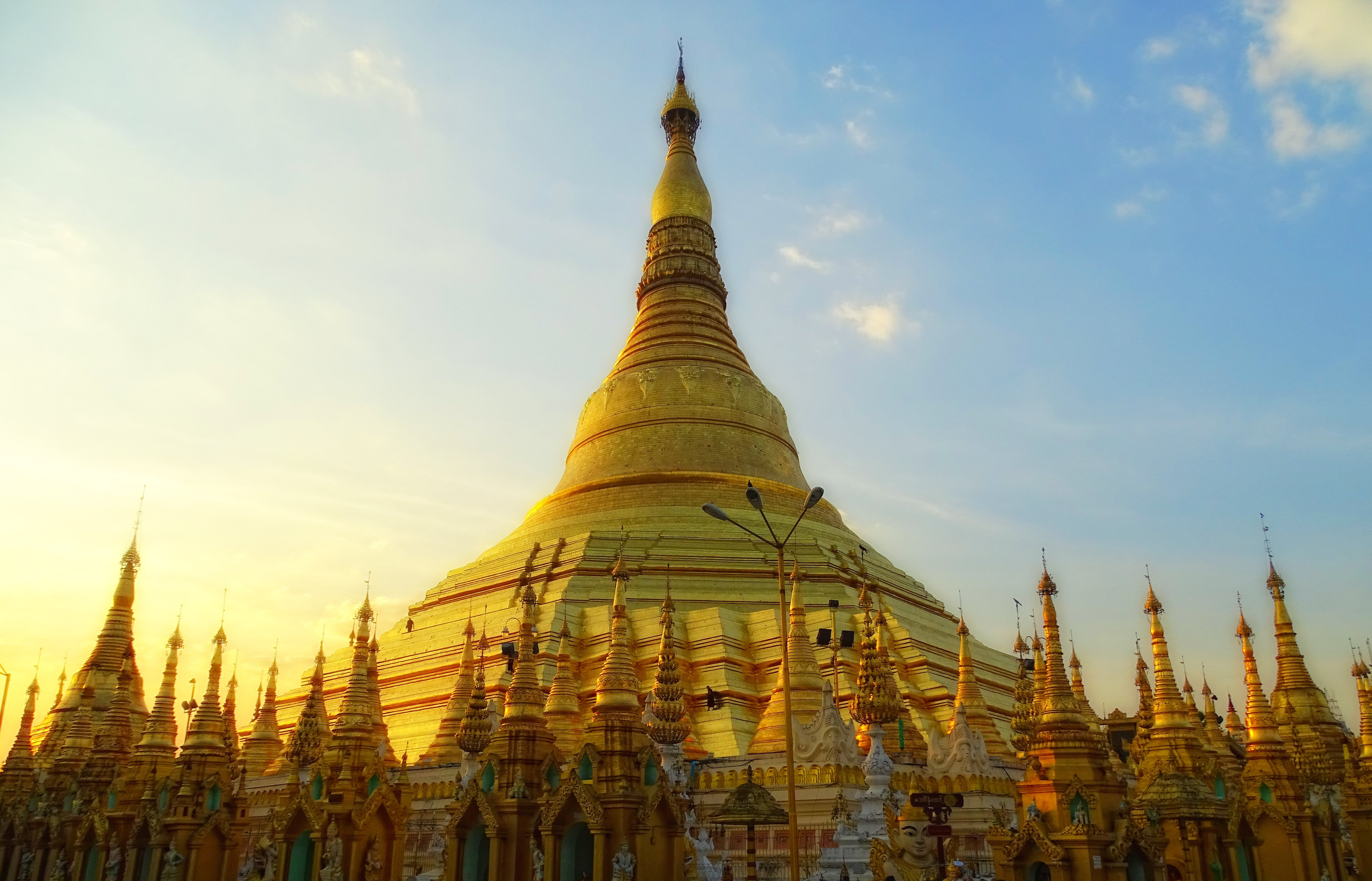
Shwedagon Pagoda, the oldest Pagoda in Myanmar, is an example of a Cetiya (စေတီ)

Cetiya, "reminders" or "memorials" (Sanskrit caitya), are objects and places used by Buddhists to remember Gautama Buddha. According to Damrong Rajanubhab, four kinds are distinguished in the Pāli Canon: "Relic [Dhatu], Memorial [Paribhoga], Teaching [Dhamma], and votive [Udesaka]." Griswold, in contrast, states that three are traditional and the fourth, the Buddha Dhamma, was added later to remind monks that the true memory of Gautama Buddha can be found in his teachings. While these can be broadly called Buddhist symbolism, the emphasis tends to be on a historical connection to the Buddha and not a metaphysical one.

In pre-Buddhist India caitya was a term for a shrine or holy place in the landscape, generally outdoors, inhabited by, or sacred to, a particular deity. In the Mahāyāna Mahāparinirvāṇa Sūtra, near the end of his life the Buddha remarks to Ananda how beautiful are the various caitya round Vaishali.

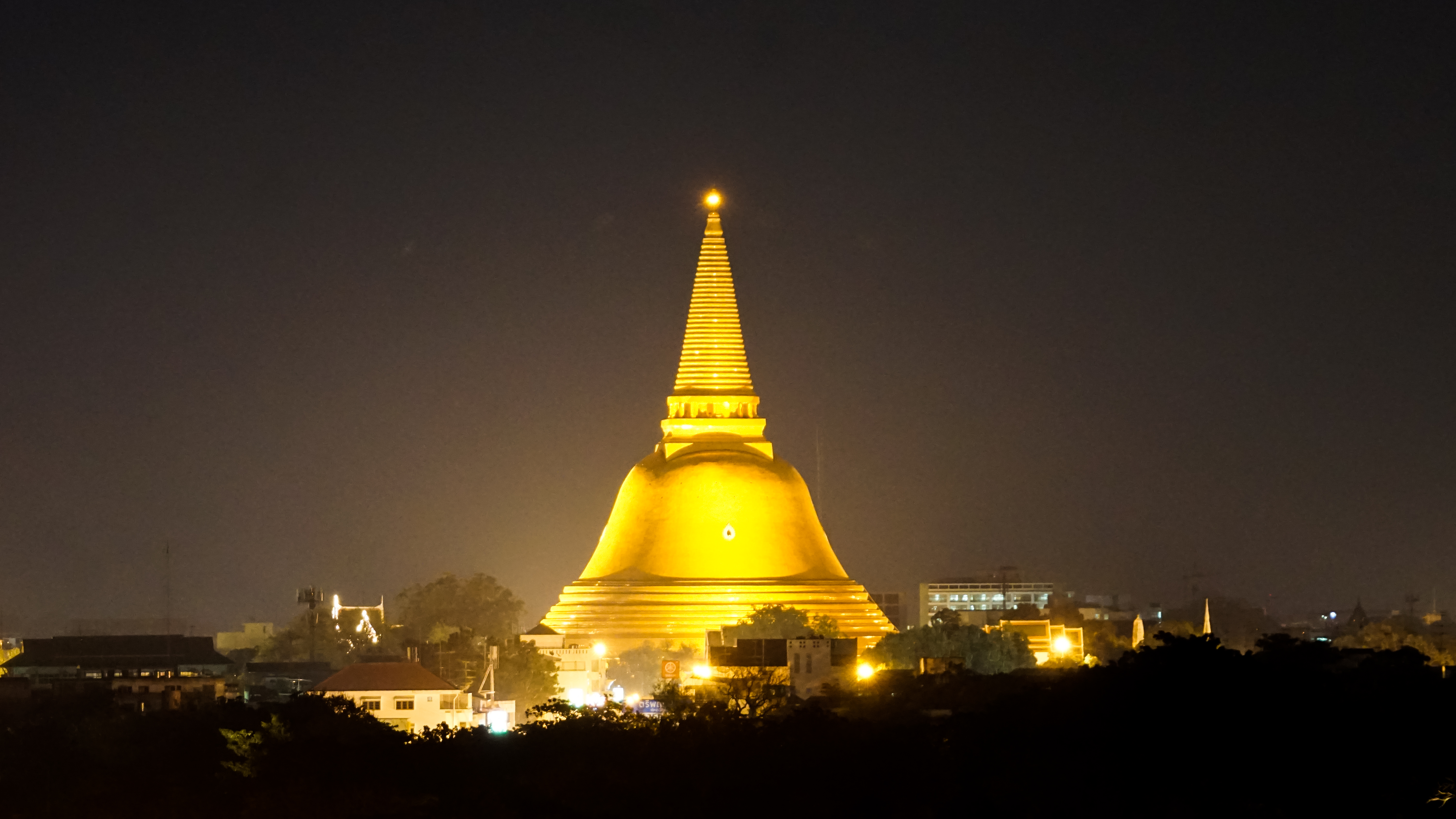
Phra Pathom Chedi, one of the biggest Chedis in Thailand; in Thai, the term Chedi (cetiya) is used interchangeably with the term Stupa

== Sārīraka ==
The sārīraka (Sanskrit śarīra) or dhātu cetiya, the remains of Gautama Buddha's body, are the category commonly considered "relics" today by Western observers, and were responsible for major forms of Buddhist art and symbolism, although they only constitute one of the three categories of reminders. Most frequently preserved parts of Buddha's body are tooth and bone, because these parts would remain after the rest of the body decayed. (But note that the body of the Buddha was cremated) The relic of the tooth of the Buddha in Sri Lanka is the most notable site where a relic is visibly preserved, but hundreds of such sites were created, in the architectural form now called a stupa. In Thai, these stupas are called chedī, retaining the second half of the phrase dhātu cetiya; in Lao, they are called that after the first half. Beyond the stupa itself, sārīraka are used across the Buddhist world, in such quantity that not all could be legitimate; in this sense the sārīraka functions mainly as a symbol, with the importance of authenticity varying between cultures.

The body parts of especially powerful monks are also called sārīraka, but these usually take on the form of bright jewels formed during the cremation of the body.

== Paribhogaka ==
The paribhoga cetiya, things used by the Buddha, would seem at first to be a nonexistent category today. However, temples such as Tongdosa in South Korea claim to keep his robe and begging bowl. The category also includes all places the Buddha visited, so Bodh Gaya itself functions as a paribhogaka. The most common paribhogaka is the Bodhi Tree, which was transplanted across Southeast Asia; cuttings of the original bodhi tree still survive today in Sri Lanka.

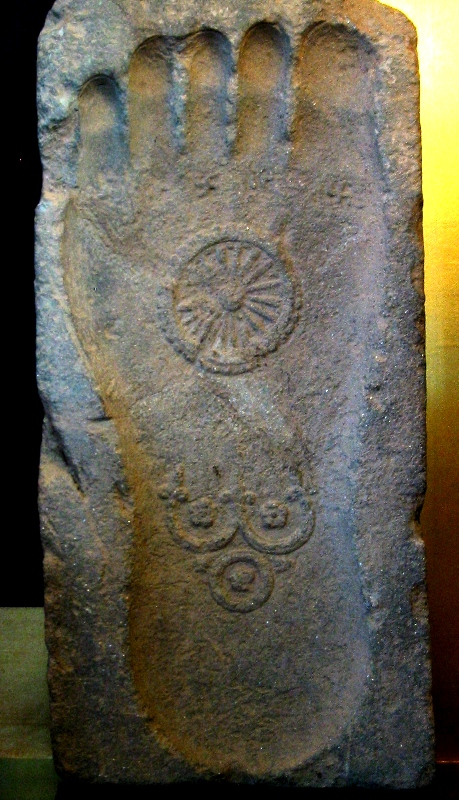
A Buddha footprint, showing the Buddhist wheel and a larger-than-life foot

Another extremely common paribhoga cetiya is the Buddha footprint, which are found across the Buddhist world symbolizing the ground that Buddha walked on and the powerful size of his dhammakāya. Sometimes these footprints are also classed as udesaka, a representation of the Buddha's foot, or sārīraka, implying that the footprint was the foot itself.

== Udesaka ==
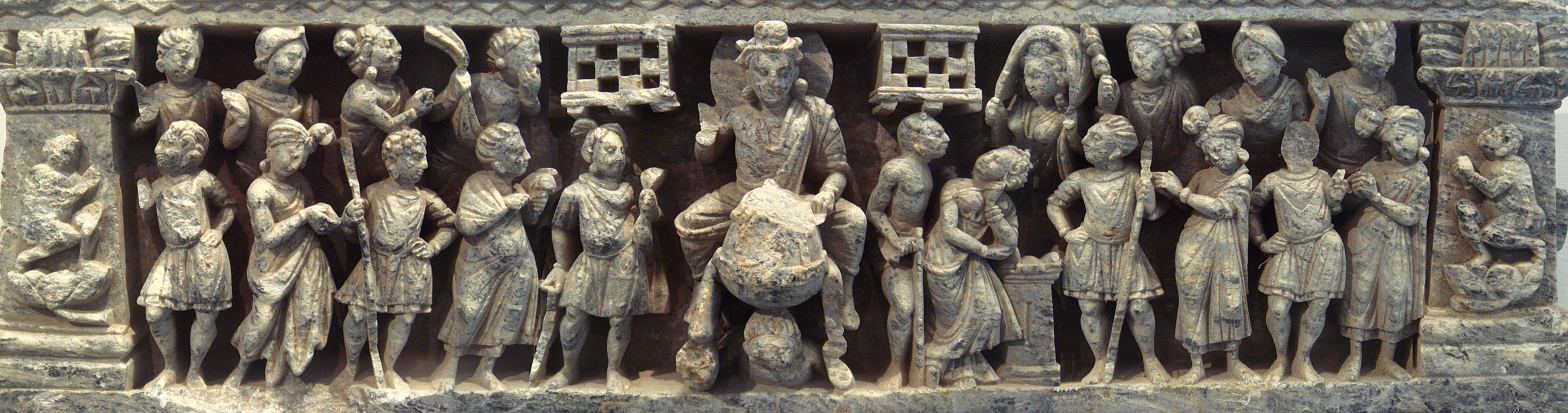
Buddha's departure from the lay life as depicted at Gandhara in the early second century CE

The final category, udesaka or uddesika cetiya, literally translates as "indicative reminders" or "votive objects", for example images of the Buddha. Udesaka do not have any physical connection to the Buddha but still serve as relics because they were created in his memory. Originally udesaka were secondary to paribhogaka and sārīraka, but with the influence of Greco-Buddhism, statues of the Buddha were produced in great numbers, followed later by paintings and other images. The dharmachakra "wheel of the dharma", falls under this category as a reminder of Buddhist insight.

The conventional view has long been this meant that early Buddhist art was aniconic. However, this view has recently been the subject of debate among specialists. There does not seem to have been any prohibition of creating images of the Buddha. Rather, creating images of the paribhogaka was regarded as a more fulfilling and meaningful symbol by the early Buddhists, evoking the discovery of Buddhist understanding (pañña). Whether these scenes contained substitutes for the image of Buddha himself is currently under debate.

== See also ==
- Burmese pagoda
- Pagoda festival
- Relics associated with Buddha
- Sand pagoda
- Stupas in Sri Lanka
- Stupas in Cambodia
