= Sand pagoda =

Buddhist stupas made of sand and erected temporarily

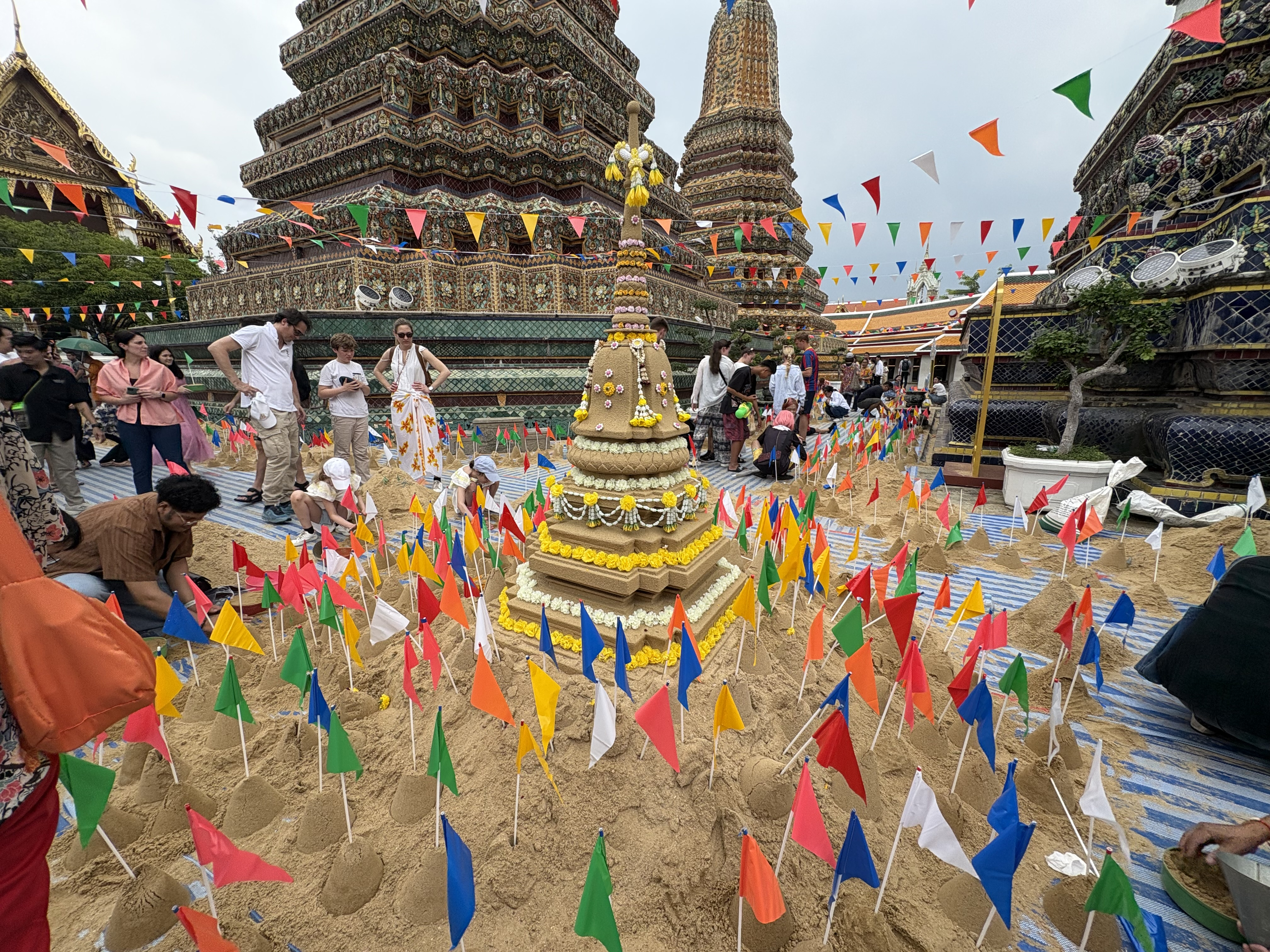
Sand pagodas at Wat Pho, Bangkok during Songkran in 2025

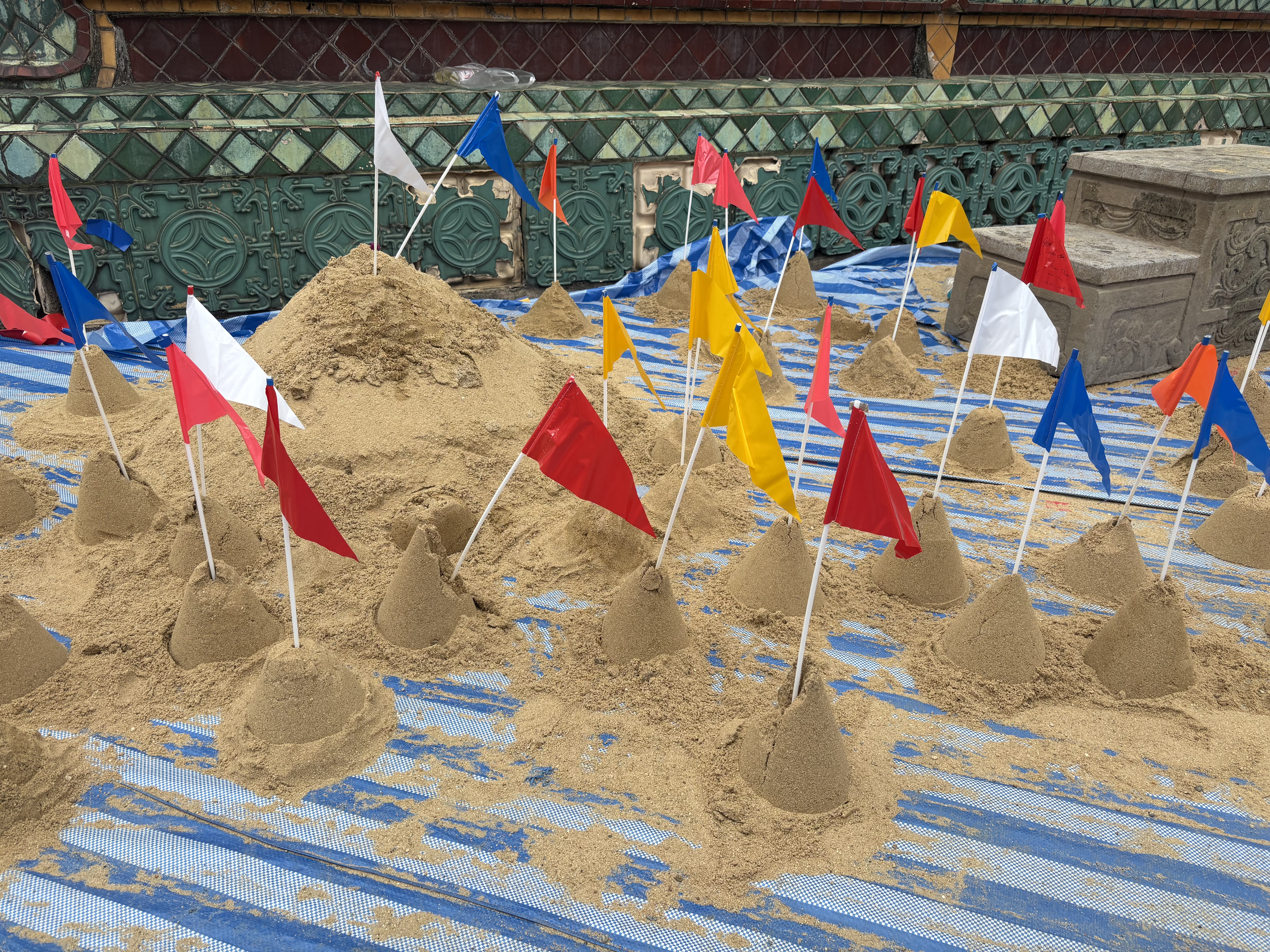
Piles of sand pagodas built during Songkran in Wat Pho, Bangkok

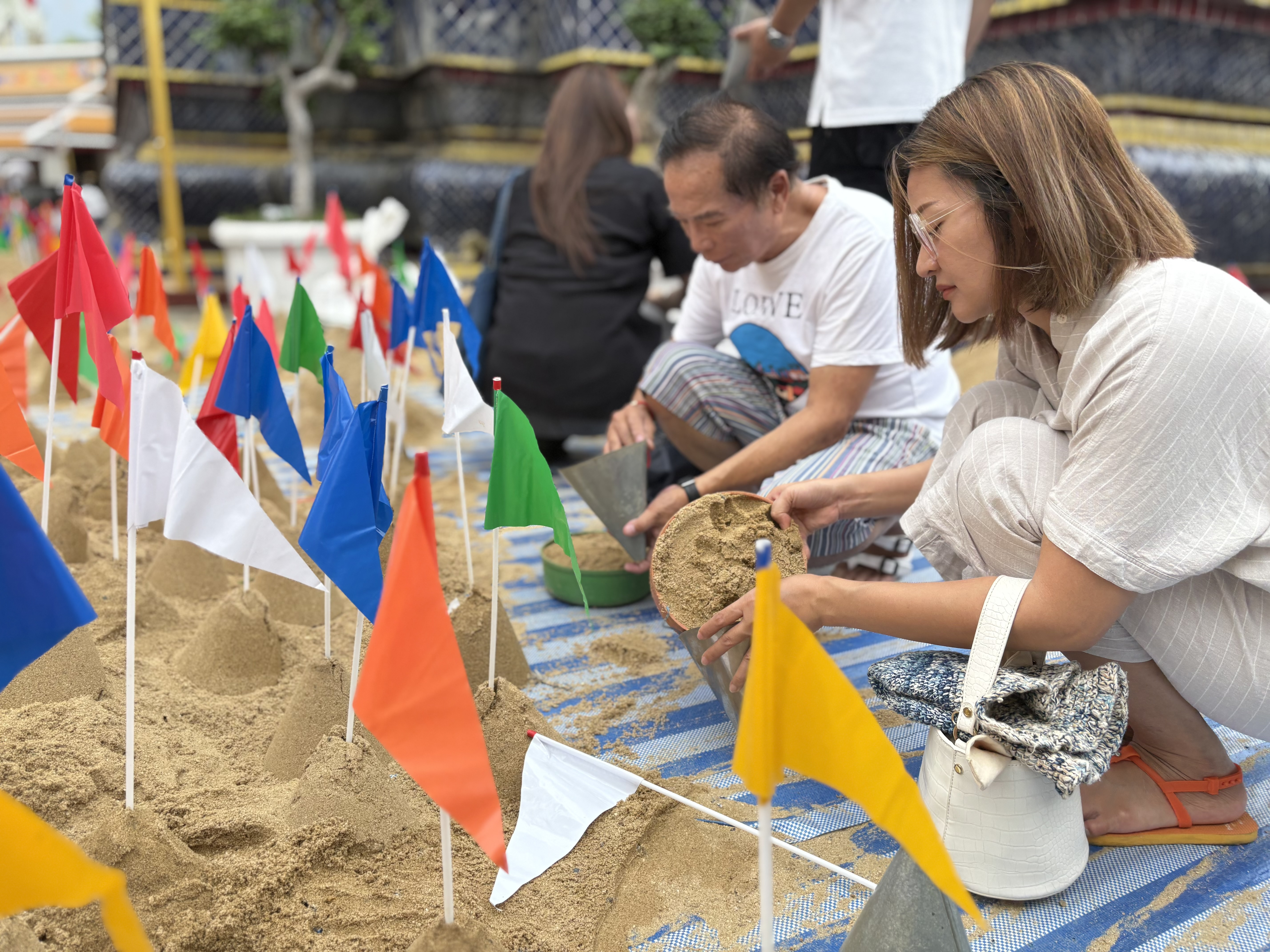
Visitors building sand pagodas during Songkran in Wat Pho, Bangkok

Sand pagodas (Burmese: သဲပုံစေတီ; Thai: พระเจดีย์ทราย, also known as sand stupas), are temporary pagodas or stupas erected from mud or sand as a means of cultivating Buddhist merit. The practice is common to Theravada Buddhists throughout mainland Southeast Asia, primarily in Myanmar (Burma), Laos, and Thailand.

== History ==
The earliest extant reference to the sand pagoda building tradition is in Burmese literary works, namely a pyo verse poem composed by Shin Maha Silavamsa during the Kingdom of Ava era (c. 1500s). However, Burmese oral tradition attributes the custom of building sand pagodas to the arrival of Ayutthayan royals, advisors and their retinue in the Konbaung Kingdom, which occurred two centuries later, following the fall of Ayutthaya in the Burmese–Siamese War (1765–1767). The custom was practiced throughout the Burmese kingdom, including by the royal court.

== Regional celebrations ==
=== Myanmar ===
During Māgha Pūjā, known as the Full Moon Day of Tabaung, Burmese devotees in Upper Myanmar construct sand pagodas in honor of the Buddha. (Note: For the merits and meditation, see "Meritorious deeds performed at religious edifices throughout nation on Full Moon Day of Tabodwe". New Light of Myanmar. 19 Mar 2011. Archived from the original on November 13, 2011. For the sand pagodas, see Thiha, Nay (18 March 2019). "What to expect on Full Moon Day of Tabaung". Myanmore. Archived from the original on 21 March 2019.) The festivities are collectively called sand pagoda festivals (သဲပုံစေတီပွဲ). The Rakhine people also build sand pagodas during this season, in a festival called Shaikthaunghmyauk festival (သျှစ်သောင်းမြှောက်ပွဲ), held on the seabanks of cities like Sittwe. Mandalay holds two major sand pagoda festivals, at the Mont Tisu and Maha Walaku Pagodas.

Burmese sand pagodas are typically of graduated five tiers, tapering to the top, with each tier flanked by bamboo masts. The five tiers represent five layers of Mount Meru, the legendary peak of Buddhist cosmology. Devotees offer fruits, flowers and other offerings, and circumambulate the sand pagoda thrice before paying homage. On the full moon day of Tabaung, the sand pagoda's umbrella crown or hti is removed.

In 1961, Burmese president U Nu performed a yadaya ritual to avert disaster in the country, by ordering the construction of 70,000 sand pagodas.

=== Thailand ===
In Northern Thailand, sand pagodas are constructed during the Thai New Year festival of Songkran. The largest such festival in Chiang Mai is held at Wat Chetlin; the resulting pagoda has five tiers, stands about 8 metres (26 ft) tall, and uses 700 cubic metres (25,000 cu ft) of sand.

== See also ==
- Buddhism in Burma
- Burmese pagoda
- Cetiya
- Māgha Pūjā
- Pagoda festival
- Stupa
- Vessantara Festival
