= Mawtinzun Pagoda =

Buddhist pagoda in Myanmar

- မဟာမကုဋရံသီဆံတော်ရှင် မြတ်မော်တင်စေတီတော်

Religion
- Affiliation: Theravada Buddhism

Location
- Country: Ngapudaw Township, Ayeyarwady Region, Myanmar
- Interactive map of Mawtinzun Pagoda
- Coordinates: 15.954885°N 94.243595°E

Mawtinzun Pagoda (Burmese: မော်တင်စွန်းဘုရား), officially known as the Mahāmakuṭaraṃsi Hsandawshin Myat Mawtin Pagoda (Burmese: မဟာမကုဋရံသီဆံတော်ရှင် မြတ်မော်တင်စေတီတော်) is a Buddhist pagoda in Ngapudaw Township, Ayeyarwady Region, Myanmar (formerly Burma). The pagoda is located along the Cape of Mawtin on the Andaman Sea. The pagoda remains underwater throughout the year, except during the pagoda festival season. The Mawtinzun Pagoda Festival is held annually during the traditional Burmese month of Tabaung. In 2015, over 5,000 tourists attended the festival.

== See also ==
- Buddhism in Myanmar
