= Shwe Indein Pagoda =

Pagoda in Indein, Myanmar

- ရွှေအင်းတိန်စေတီ
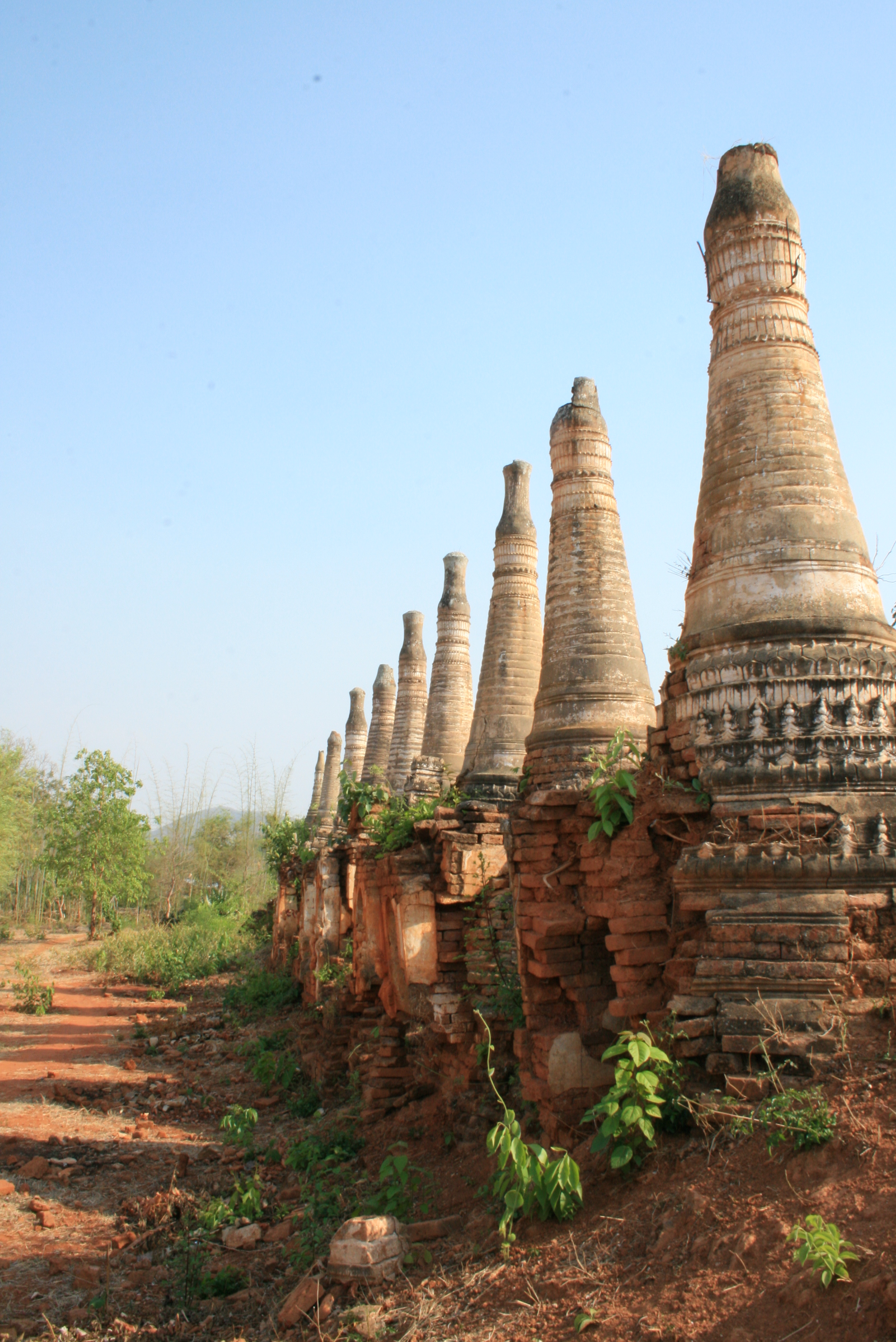

Religion
- Affiliation: Theravada Buddhism

Location
- Location: Indein, Shan State
- Country: Myanmar
- Interactive map of Shwe Indein Pagoda
- Coordinates: 20°27′20.50″N 96°50′11.17″E

Architecture
- Completed: c. 12th-13th century

The Shwe Indein Pagoda (Burmese: ရွှေအင်းတိန်စေတီ) is a group of Buddhist pagodas in the village of Indein, near Ywama and Inlay Lake in Shan State, Myanmar (formerly Burma).

The pagodas were commissioned during the reign of King Narapatisithu. However, tradition holds that they were built by King Ashoka (known in Burmese as Dhammasoka ဓမ္မသောက), and renewed by King Anawrahta. However, there is no archaeological evidence to support this theory about Ashoka's role.

== Photo gallery ==
Shwe Indein Pagoda - ရွှေအင်းတိန်စေတီ

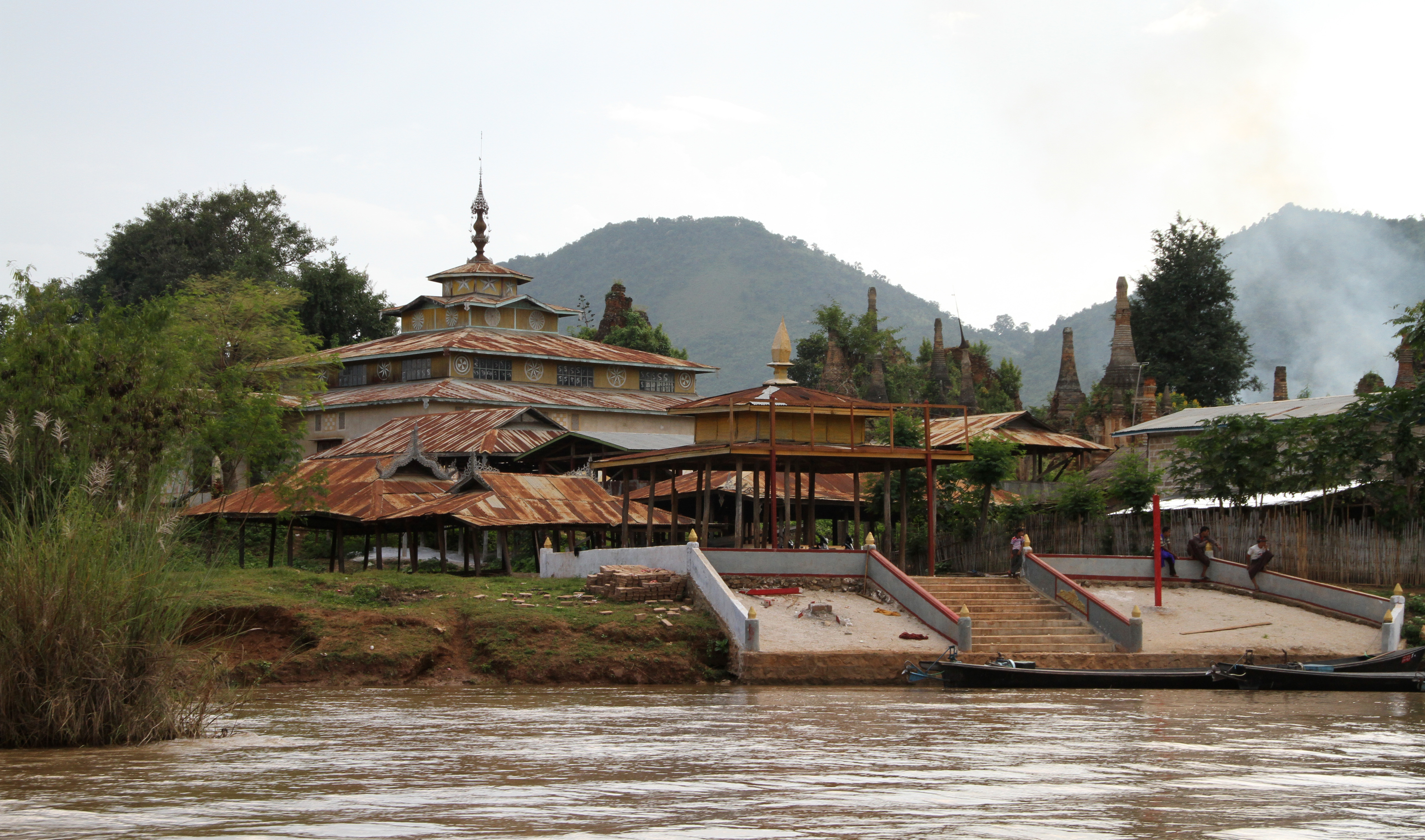

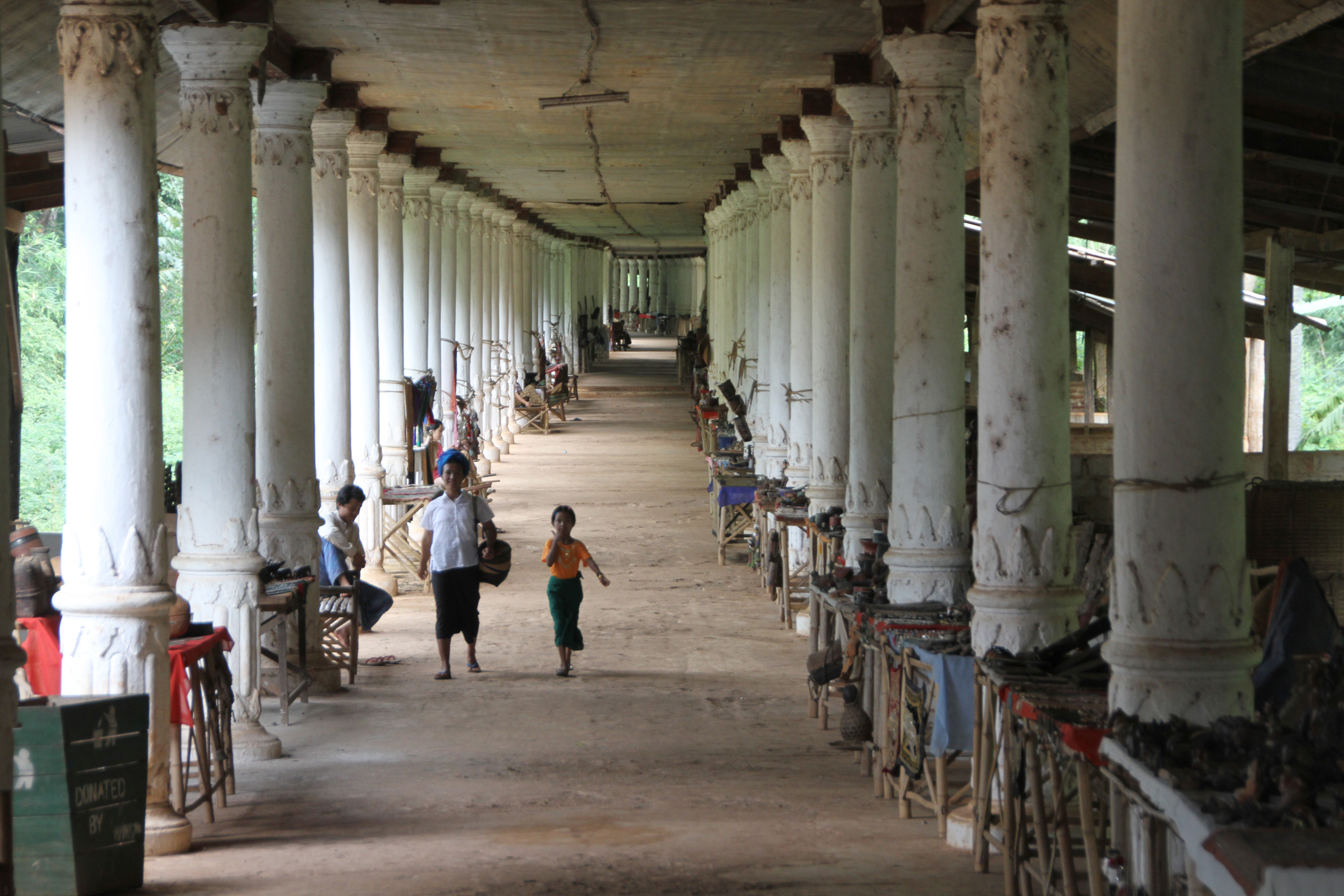

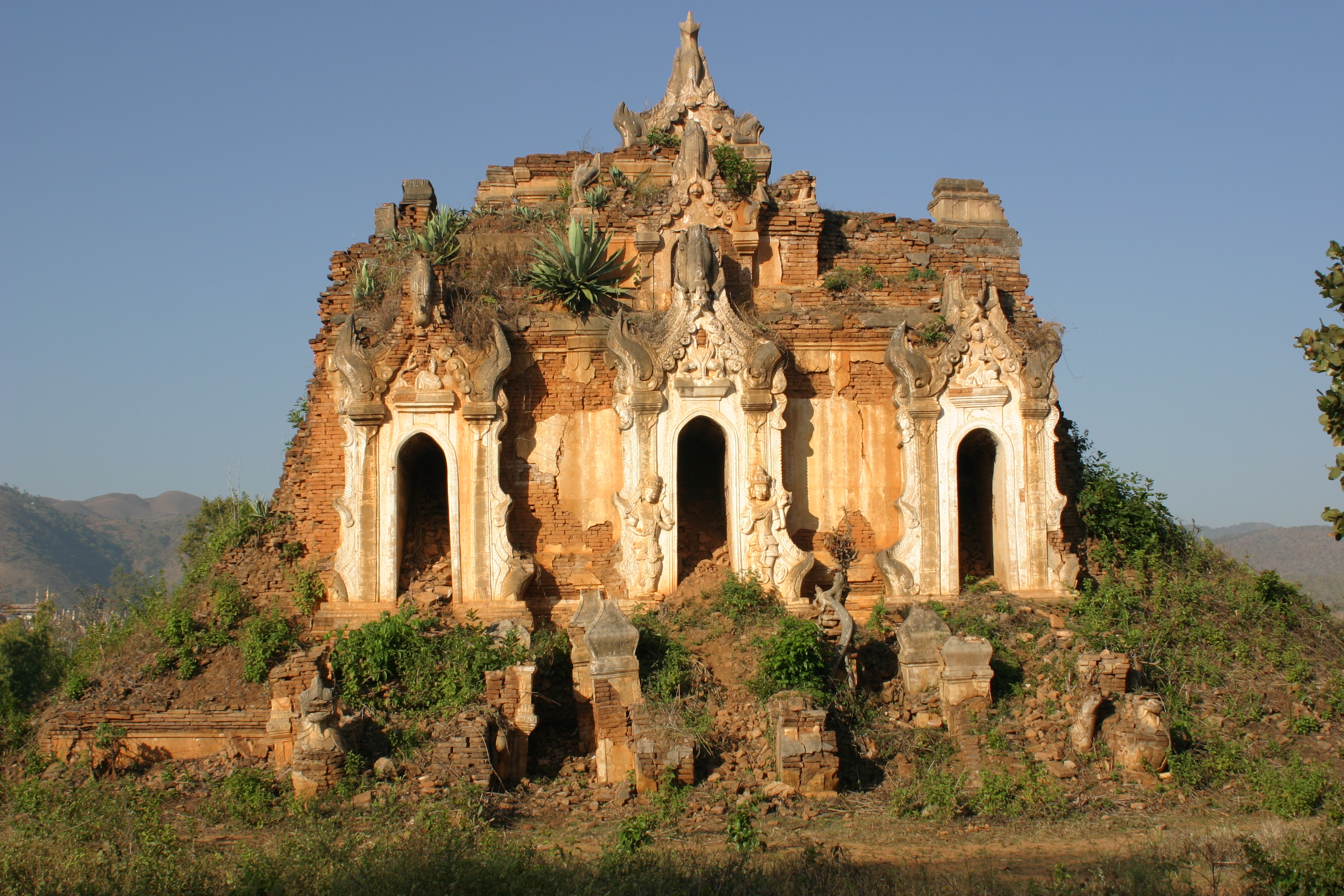

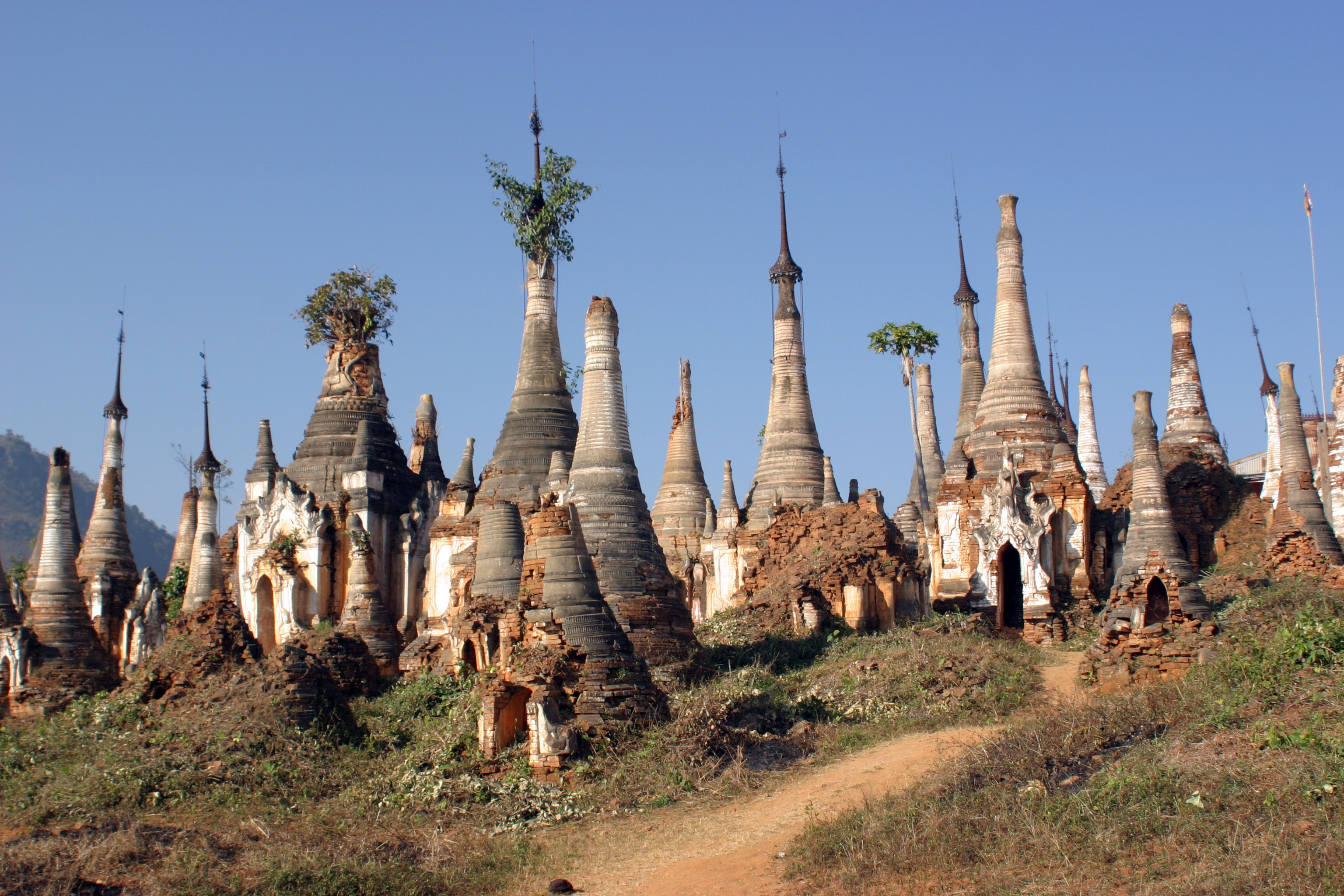

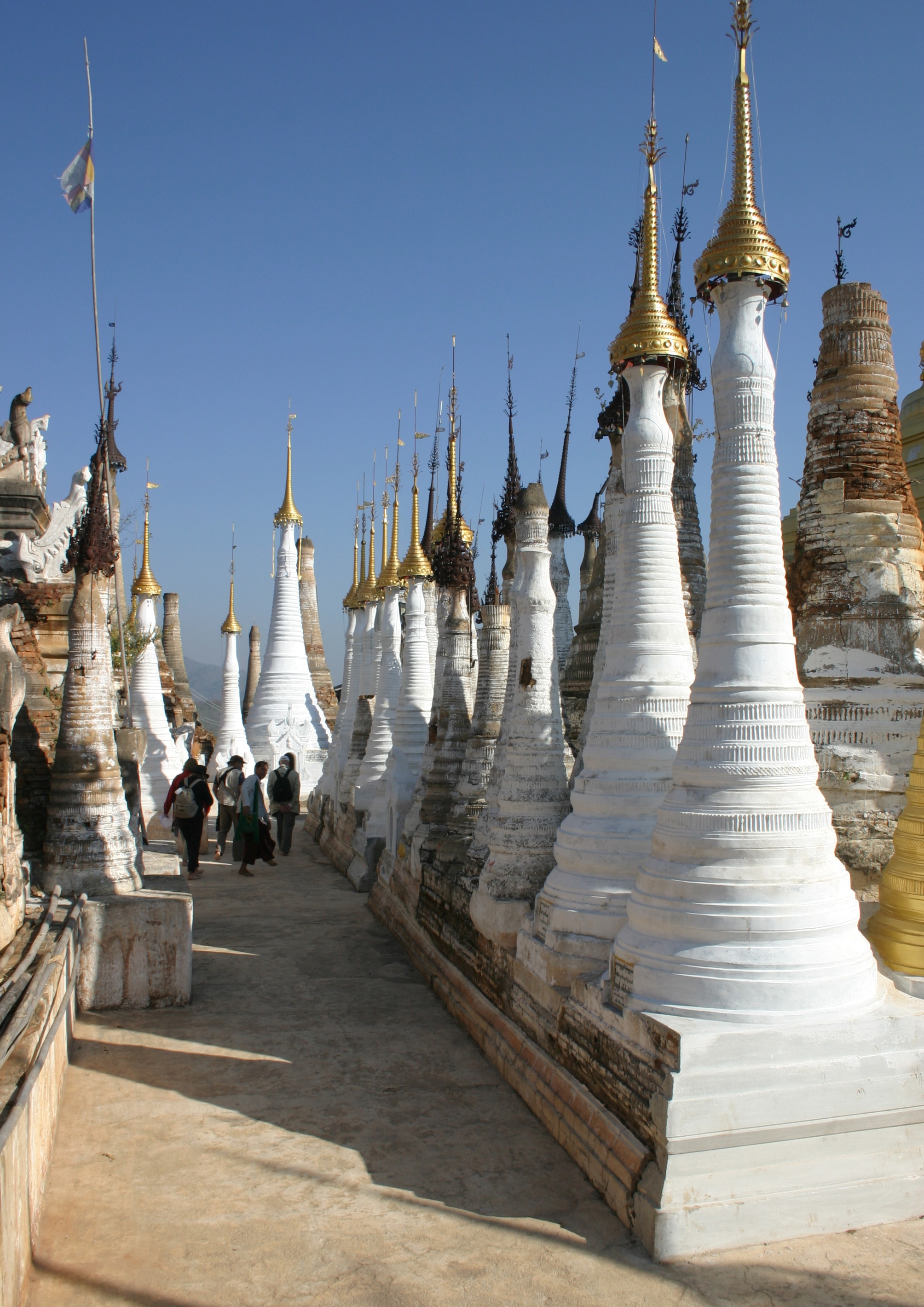

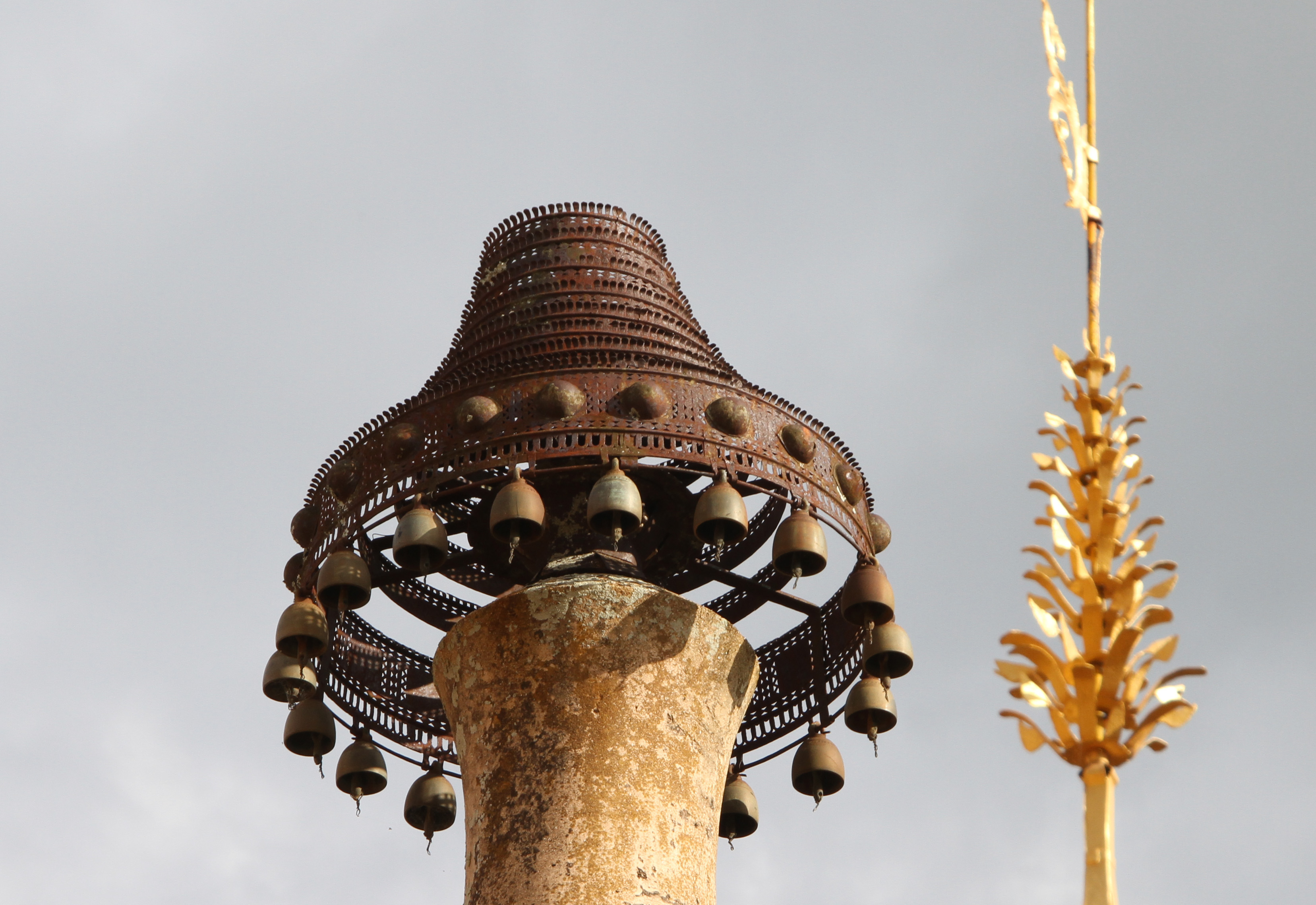

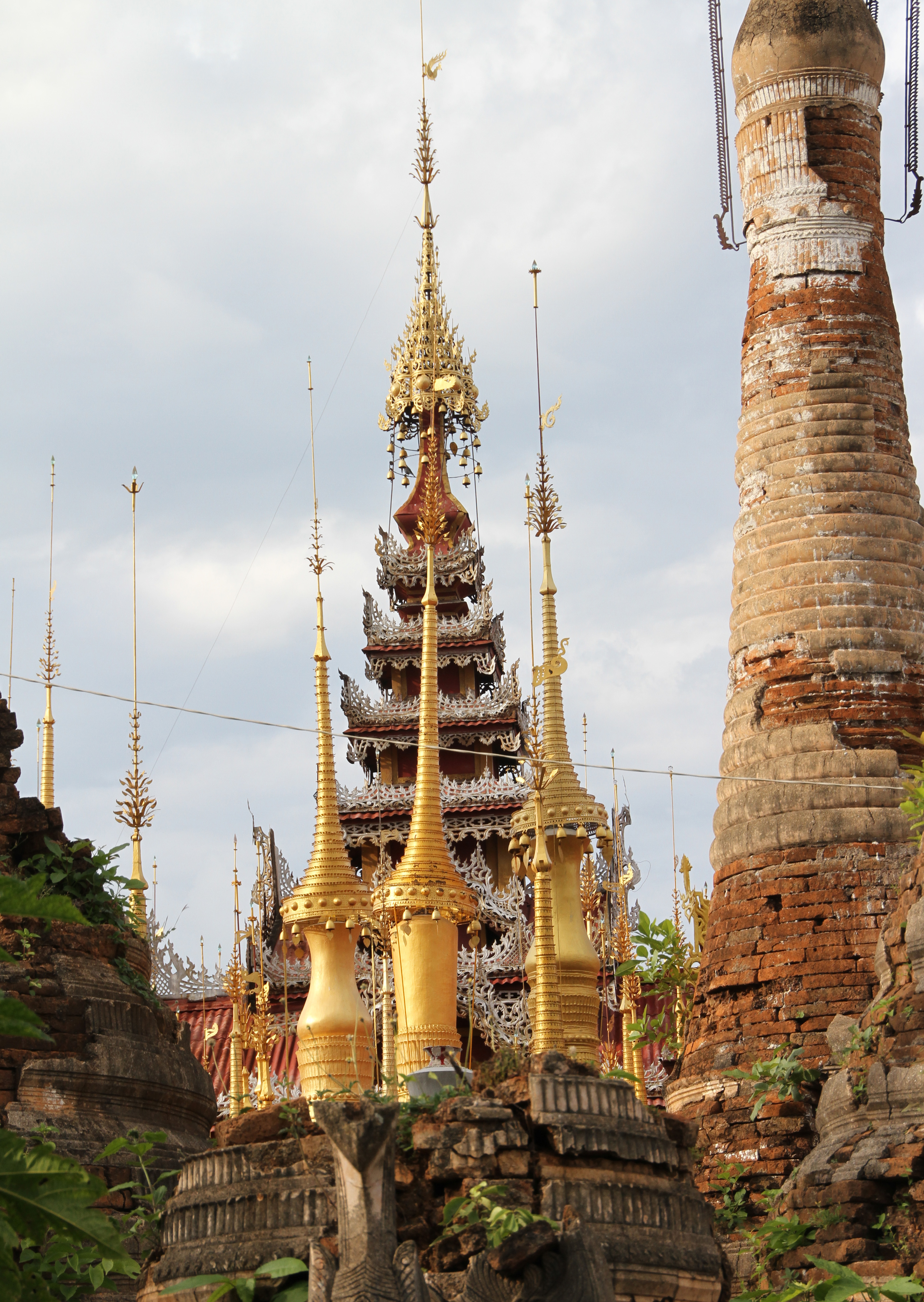

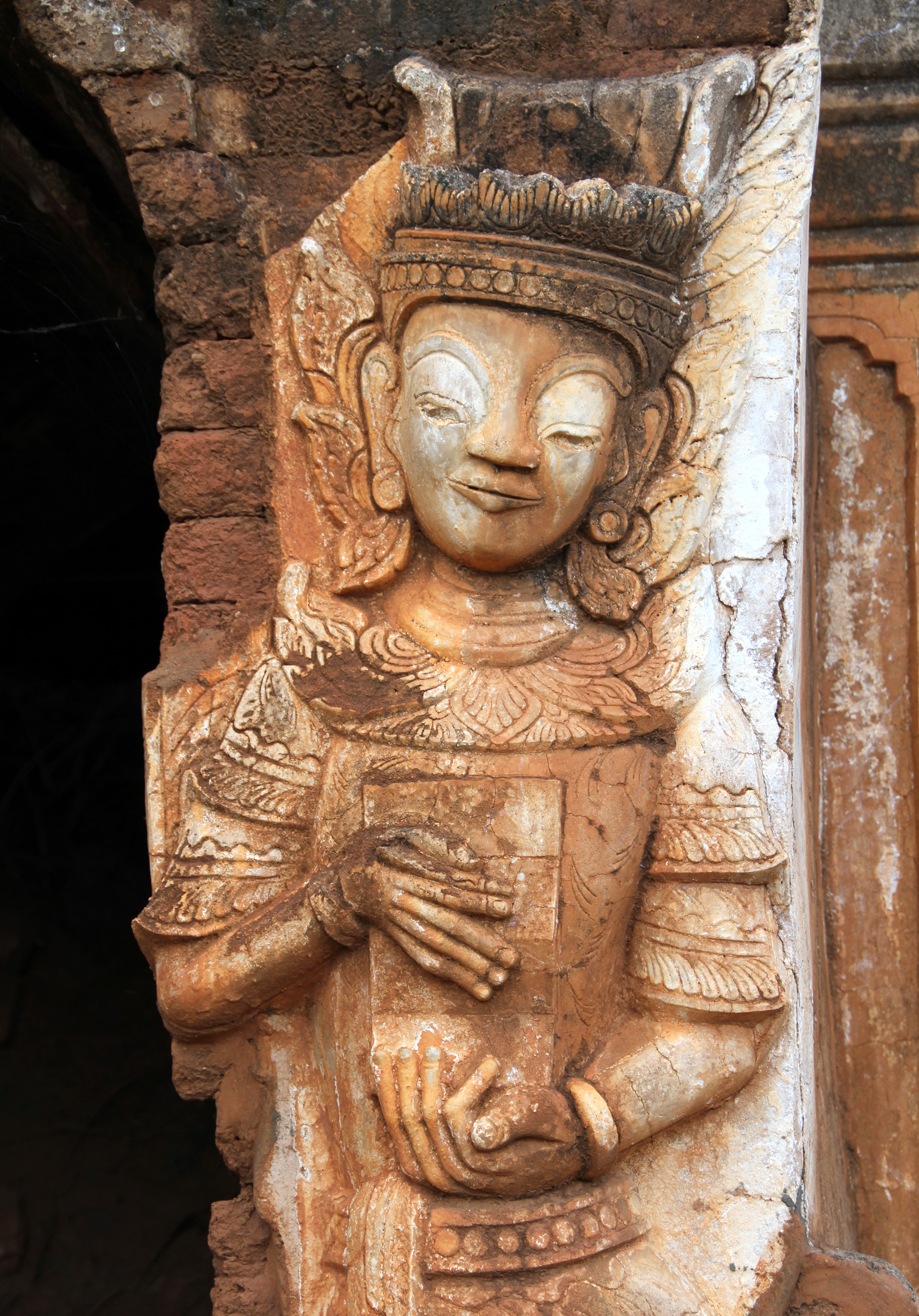

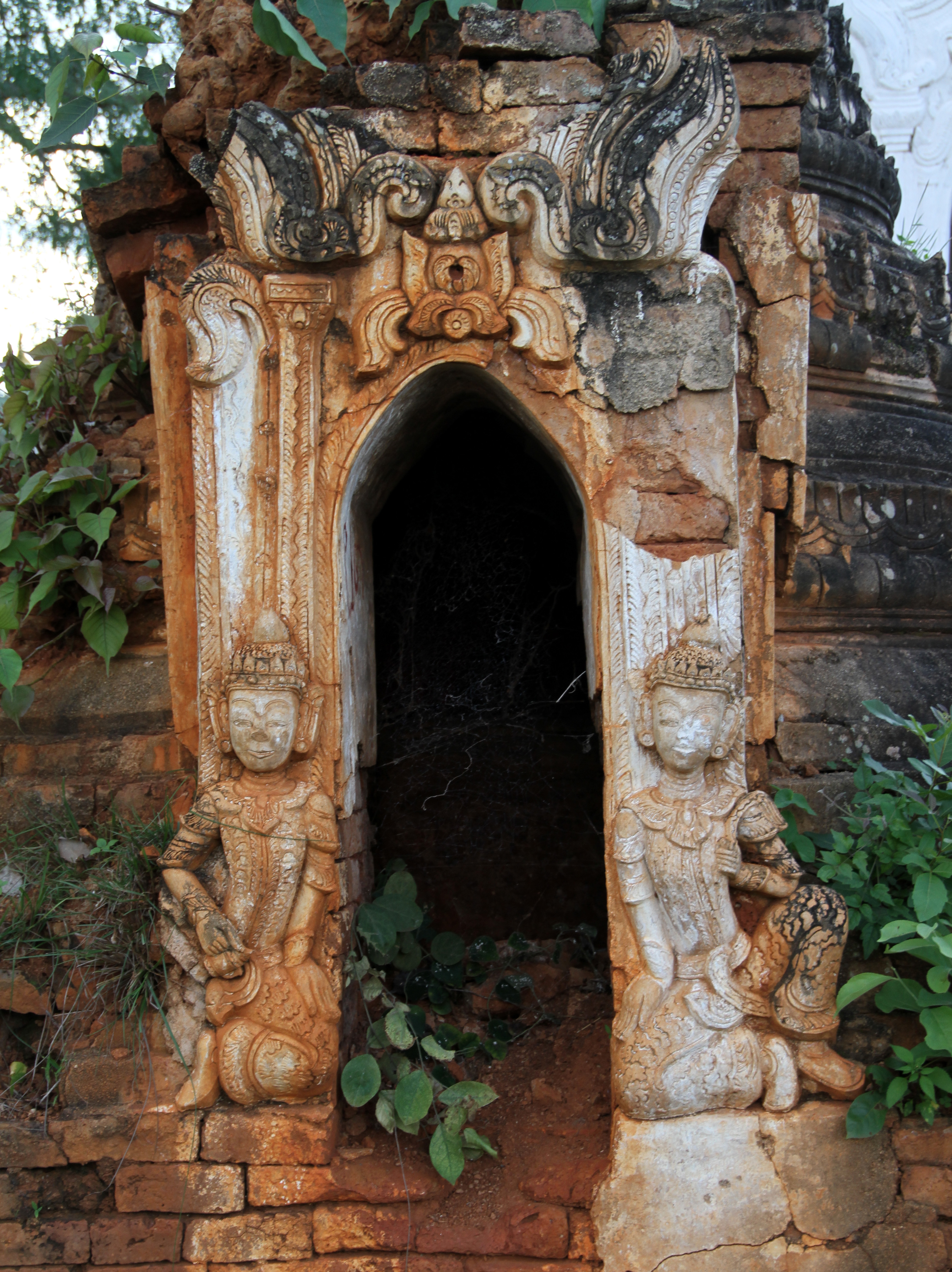
