= Tabaung =

Twelfth month of the Burmese calendar

Tabaung (Burmese: တပေါင်း) is the twelfth and final month of the traditional Burmese calendar.

== Festivals and observances ==
- Tabaung Festival (Magha Puja) - full moon of Tabaung
- Sand Pagoda Festival (သဲပုံစေတီပွဲတော်)
- 28 Pagoda Parade Festival, Pyinmana Township
- Pagoda festivals
  - Shwedagon Pagoda Festival
  - Alaungdaw Kathapa Pagoda Festival, Sagaing Region
  - Shwesettaw Pagoda Festival, Minbu Township, Magwe Region
  - Shwesayan Pagoda Festival (Patheingyi Township, Mandalay Region)
  - Kekku Pagoda Festival, Shan State

== Tabaung symbols ==
- Flower: Calophyllum calaba (synonym Calophyllum amoenum)

== See also ==
- Burmese calendar
- Festivals of Burma
