= Ywama =

- village
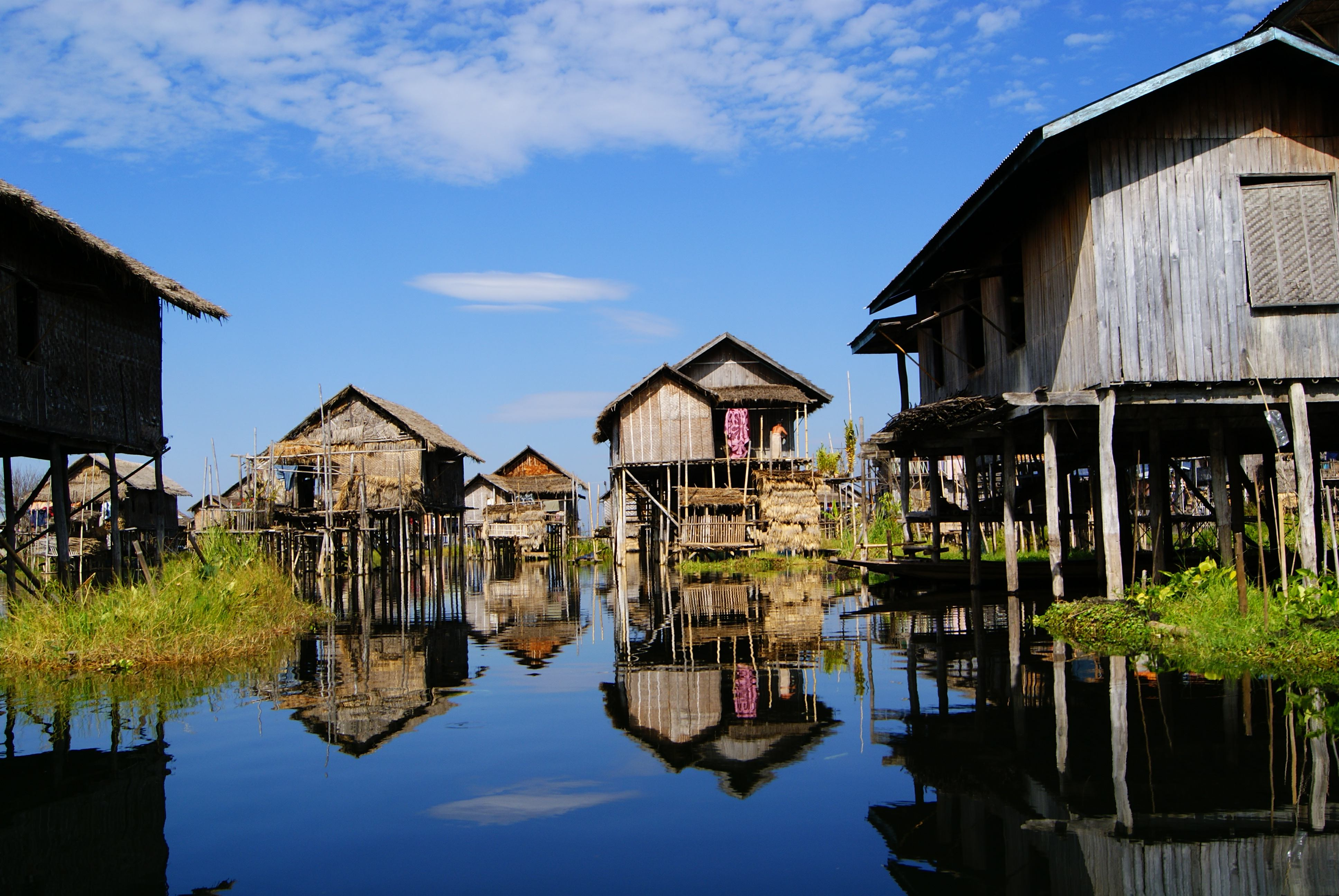

- Location in Burma
- Coordinates: 20°34′0″N 96°53′0″E
- Country: Burma
- Division: Shan State
- Elevation: 2,913 ft (888 m)

Population
  - Religions: Buddhism
- Time zone: UTC+6.30 (MST)

Ywama village, also known as Heya Ywama, is located on the western side of Inle Lake in Nyaungshwe Township, Taunggyi District, Shan State, Myanmar. The village is most easily accessible by boat from the town of Nyaung Shwe on the north side of the lake.

Nearly all the homes and buildings are constructed on piles driven into the lake bed. Residents travel around by canoe, but there are also numerous bamboo walkways and bridges over the canals running throughout. As such, there is no main street or square, but there are pagoda complexes and monasteries on built-up areas.

Ywama is part of the 5-day rotating market cycle of Inle (the market appears in a different location on the lake each day). Ywama's market takes place on the grounds of a pagoda complex. However, much of the commerce takes place on the water as merchants, their small boats loaded with handicrafts or produce, do business with locals and tourists. This floating market is a big draw to visitors of the lake.

The village is home to a monastery and a stupa, weaving, metal smithing, wood carving and umbrella workshops. There are also many "floating gardens" where farmers plant crops like tomatoes on floating mats of vegetation anchored in place with bamboo poles.

From the air, the area is so filled with floating vegetation that it appears more land than lake.

Ywama is just south of Nga Phe Kyaung (Jumping Cat Monastery) and north east of the Indein village the Shwe Indein Pagoda.
