= Pagoda festival =

Buddhist festivals and fiestas in Myanmar

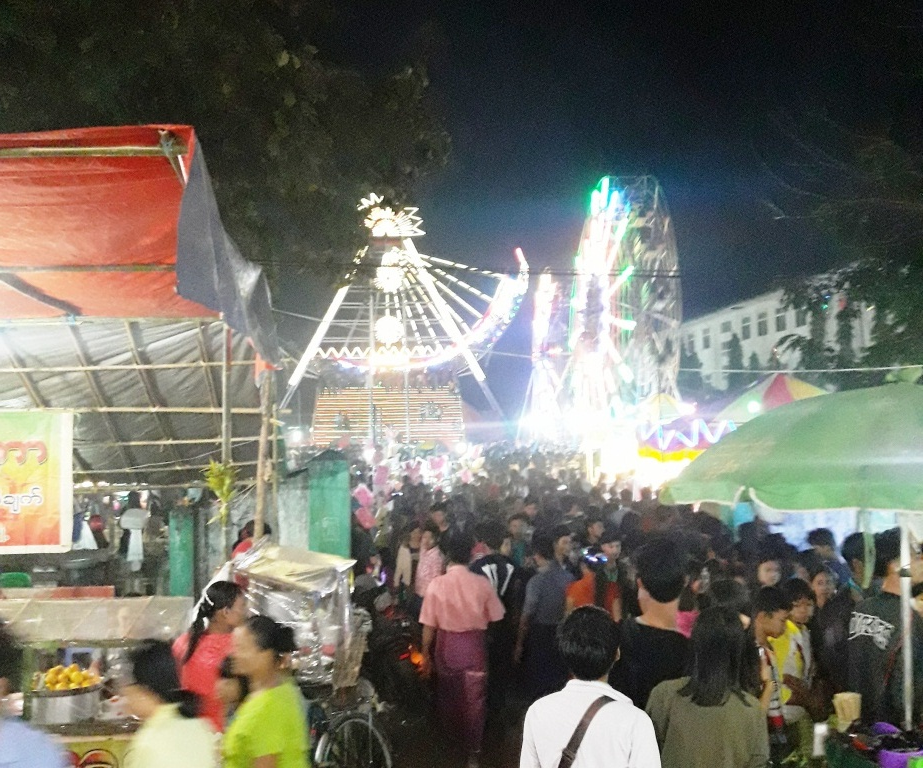
Temporary bazaar and amusement rides of Shwesandaw Pagoda festival in Pyay, Myanmar

Pagoda festivals (Burmese: ဘုရားပွဲ; paya pwe) are regular festivals found throughout Myanmar that commemorate major religious events in pagoda's history, including the founding of a pagoda and the crowning of the pagoda's hti (umbrella). Pagoda festivals are dictated by the Burmese religious calendar and often are held several days at a time. Major events in a pagoda festival typically do not coincide with Uposatha (Buddhist Sabbath) days, during which pious Buddhists observe the Eight Precepts. The majority of pagoda festivals are held during the dry season, from the months of Tazaungmon (November) to Tabaung (March). During the full moon day of Tabaung (Magha Puja), Buddhist devotees in various parts of Myanmar also celebrate sand pagoda festivals.

More well-known pagoda festivals often attract numerous pilgrims from throughout the country.

Pagoda festivals are similar in nature to agricultural shows (country fairs) or carnivals, and form a significant important part of cultural life, particularly in the countryside. During pagoda festivals, temporary bazaars (including food stalls and merchandise stands), entertainment venues (including anyeint dramas, yoke the performances, lethwei matches, and arcades) are set up in the vicinity of the pagoda.

== Major pagoda festivals ==
- Shwe Settaw Pagoda Festival (Minbu Township, Magwe Region) - Tabodwe to Tabaung
- Ananda Temple Festival (Bagan, Mandalay Region) - Pyatho
- Shwezigon Pagoda Festival (Bagan, Mandalay Region) -
- Kyaikhtiyo Pagoda Festival (Kyaikhto, Mon State) - Nadaw
- Shwedagon Pagoda Festival (Yangon, Yangon Region) - Tabaung
- Alaungdaw Kathapa Pagoda Festival (Sagaing Region) - Tabodwe
- Shwe Sayan Pagoda Festival (Thaton, Mon State) -
- Shwesayan Pagoda Festival (Patheingyi Township, Mandalay Region) - Tabaung
- Myathalun Pagoda Festival (Magwe Region) - Thadingyut
- Shite-thaung Temple Festival (Mrauk U, Rakhine State) -
- Hpaung Daw U Pagoda Festival (Shan State) - Thadingyut
- Kyaikkhauk Pagoda Festival (Thanlyin Township, Yangon Region) - Tabodwe
- Shwesandaw Pagoda Festival (Twante Township, Yangon Region) - Tagu
- Botahtaung Pagoda Festival (Yangon) - Nadaw
- Mawtinzun Pagoda Festival (Ngapudaw Township, Ayeyarwady Region) - Tabaung
- Shwemawdaw Pagoda Festival (Bago) - Tagu

== See also ==
- Buddhism in Burma
- Burmese calendar
- Burmese pagoda
- Sand pagoda
- Thadingyut Festival
- Vessantara Festival
