= Vessantara Festival =

Theravada Buddhist Festival celebrating the penultimate life of Gautama Buddha

- Also called: Boun Pha Vet (in Laos); Medin Full Moon Poya (in Sri Lanka); Thet Mahachat (in Thailand)
- Observed by: Thais, Lao, Sri Lankans, Cambodians and Burmese
- Type: Buddhist
- Significance: Commemorates the Vessantara Jataka
- Date: Full moon day of the 12th lunar month

The Vessantara Festival is one of the 12 monthly Buddhist festivals celebrated yearly in Theravada Buddhist pagodas in memory of Vessantara, remembered as the penultimate life of the Buddha. It is the only previous life of the Buddha which is celebrated with such importance.

== Rite ==
The festival is usually celebrated in the preaching hall or sala of the local temple or wat, beginning early in the morning and lasting until midnight. The festival usually takes place yearly for three full days between February and April, during the fourth lunar month.

The festival includes a procession of one thousand balls of sticky rice to the temple to symbolize each verse of the long chant; the process of listening to the nonstop sermon on the Great Birth at the temple; merit making to transfer it to the deceased relatives and the departure of a "caravan", buffaloes, and oxcart for sale in distant lands.

=== Preparation ===
A few days preceding the feast, stages are built to host to folk opera and popular dancing. A pavilion to store paddy contributions is constructed. The reception hall is decorated with painted cloths. Old women roll cigarettes, make betel-nut packets, and candles.

=== Invocation of the protective spirits ===
The spirit of Upagupta is invited to come from the Mekong River and enter a statue, which is then carried to the temple holding the festival. In the areas where there is no river, the spirit can be invited through normal water pipes, as in Vientiane in Laos. Upagupta is supposed to protect the ritual surroundings of the temple during the performance. Before the recitation of the Vessantara Jataka, other figures are invoked through a sort of recitation of a text called "The Ten Thousand Malay" found in printed Lao version of the Vessantara Jataka.

=== Hommage to the tevada ===
On the morning of the third day, after a ceremony in which respect is paid to the tevada who are asked to witness the merit-making ceremony, the procession of 1000 lumps of rice takes place without just the faithful and no monks.

=== Recitation of the Vessantara Jataka ===
The three-day celebration focuses on monks who recite the story of the second-to-last incarnation of Buddha as Prince Vessantara. The long chant consisting of a thousand verses, was originally recorded on fourteen sets of palm-leaf manuscripts. The monks recite the full story in vernacular language without intermission in a performance lasting between twelve and eighteen hours.

== Music ==
The original text of the Vessantara Jataka sermon was entirely in Pali; it is now customarily recited in the vernacular languages with some Pali stanzas interspersed throughout, but these cannot be understood by most laity. At the end of each chapter and before the following one, a hard-mallet pin piet ensemble customarily plays from a standard repertoire. Those who know the pieces can detect which chapter is about to start, even from a distance. Today, such complete performances are rare.

== Theater ==
The Vessantara Festival or Great Birth festival was once "one of the most theatrical of all the Buddhist festivals".

Monks and novices were invited to perform the characters of the Vessantara story.

Some of the scenes, especially the mismatched couple formed by Jujaka, the old Brahmin, and his young wife Amittada, are attractive for the public during the festival. The parts of the story in which Matrsi and Jujaka appear as extremes of tragedy and comedy: the Matsi episodes elicit great sadness as Matsi mourns the loss of her children while the Jujuaka episodes elicit gales of laughter when Jujaka is shown to be a buffoon.

== Regional variations ==
The celebration of the Vessantara Jataka varies from region to region throughout the ritual calendar. While it has lost its traditional importance in some areas, in others it has gained in popularity.

=== Cambodia ===
According to the Angkorian inscription No. K. 485, which was found at Phimeanakas temple and composed by Princess Indradevi in the 13th century AD, the Vessantara Jataka was performed as a religious dance. This tradition of performances has not completely been lost from the Khmer tradition, as the Vessantara jataka is nowadays celebrated as a theatrical performance during the festival by non-professional actors. As the monks were proclaim each section, villagers are selected to dress up as the main characters in the story.

Today, Buddhists in a village around any given pagoda take turns to read out the total of 13 volumes of the Vessantara Jataka.

The celebration starts with the parade of an ikat silk cloth featuring the story of Vessantara.

The festival ends with a procession of all the participants around the pagoda carrying various offerings as if accompagnying Vassantara back to his kingdom.

=== Burma ===
Mentioned in the Burmese historical chronicle Maha Yazawin, the arahan Shin Upagutta is another important figure in the Burmese version of the Vessantara Festival.

=== Laos: Boun Pha Vet ===
During the Boun Pha Vet in Laos, for 3 days and 3 nights, the monks take turns to read about the life of King Phavet.

In Laos, as well as in Isan, a long painted scroll held aloft by young and old and accompanied by drums and dancers, is taken in procession from the forest through the village lanes to the pagoda, bringing Prince Vessentara back to his city. In carrying the scroll, and performing the narrative, villagers create a visual and material universe conveying meanings beyond the written text.

=== Sri Lanka ===
In Sri Lanka, verses of lament from the text Vessantara Kāvya are often recited at the corpse of a relative who just died, especially the verses of Madri mourning the loss of her children. This text was composed in Sri Lanka in the early modern period by a secular poet, and emphasizes abandonment and emotional desolation. The themes were very popular among the ordinary people, though the emphasis was very different than the earlier Buddhist texts.

=== Thailand ===
==== Thet Mahachat ====
In Thailand, the Vessantara Jataka Festival is known as Thet Mahachat (Thai: เทศน์มหาชาติ), from Maha Jati or "Great Birth", in Central Thailand. It is also known in Isanas Bun Phawet (Bun Phra Wes), Bun Duan Sii ('Merit-making of the fourth month') or Thet Phawet in Isan. . The Thet Mahachat is very popular both in rural and urban communities in Thailand, often with dance and drama performances, as well as festive parades and processions through the towns. During this Buddhist festival the monks give a sermon about the entire text of the Vessantara Jataka, accompanied by rituals and cultural performances. Because of its central role in the Thet Mahachat or Boun Pha Vet celebrations, the Vessantara Jataka is an important part of the traditional folklore in many areas of the Southeast Asian region. The tale of Phra Malai has traditionally been recited as a preface to the Vessantara Jataka festival in Thailand and Laos.

==== Phi Ta Khon ====
Whereas the Thet Mahachat is associated to the birth of Vessantara, in Thailand, the Phi Ta Khon is another festival traditionally ascribed to a story of the Vessantara Jataka in which the Buddha in one of his past lives as a prince made a long journey and was presumed dead. The celebrations on his return were so raucous as to wake the dead.

== Literature ==
Khamsing Srinawk's 1969 story Dark Glasses depicts the disappearance of a young girl lured to Bangkok, presumably to work as a prostitute, until she returns for the Vessantara festival, a ritual migration undertaken by the children of Northeastern Thailand.

== Bibliography ==
- Kaiser, Thomas; Lefferts, Leedom; Wernsdörfer, Martina (2017). Devotion: Image, Recitation, and Celebration of the Vessantara Epic in Northeast Thailand. Arnoldsche Art Publishers. ISBN 978-3-89790-500-9.
- Appleton, Naomi (2014-01-01). "Buddhist Storytelling in Thailand and Laos: The Vessantara Jataka Scroll at the Asian Civilisations Museum by Leedom Lefferts and Sandra Cate, with Wajuppa Tossa. Singapore: Asian Civilisations Museum 2012. 163pp. Hb., $21.59. ISBN-13:9789810724788". Buddhist Studies Review. 30 (2). doi:10.1558/bsrv.v30i2.275. ISSN 1747-9681.
- Pannyawamsa, Sengpan (2009-05-01). "Recital Of The Tham Vessantara–jĀtaka: A Social–cultural Phenomenon In Kengtung, Eastern Shan State, Myanmar". Contemporary Buddhism. 10 (1): 125–139. doi:10.1080/14639940902969127. ISSN 1463-9947. S2CID 144115502.
