= Burmese pagoda =

Buddhist stupas in Myanmar

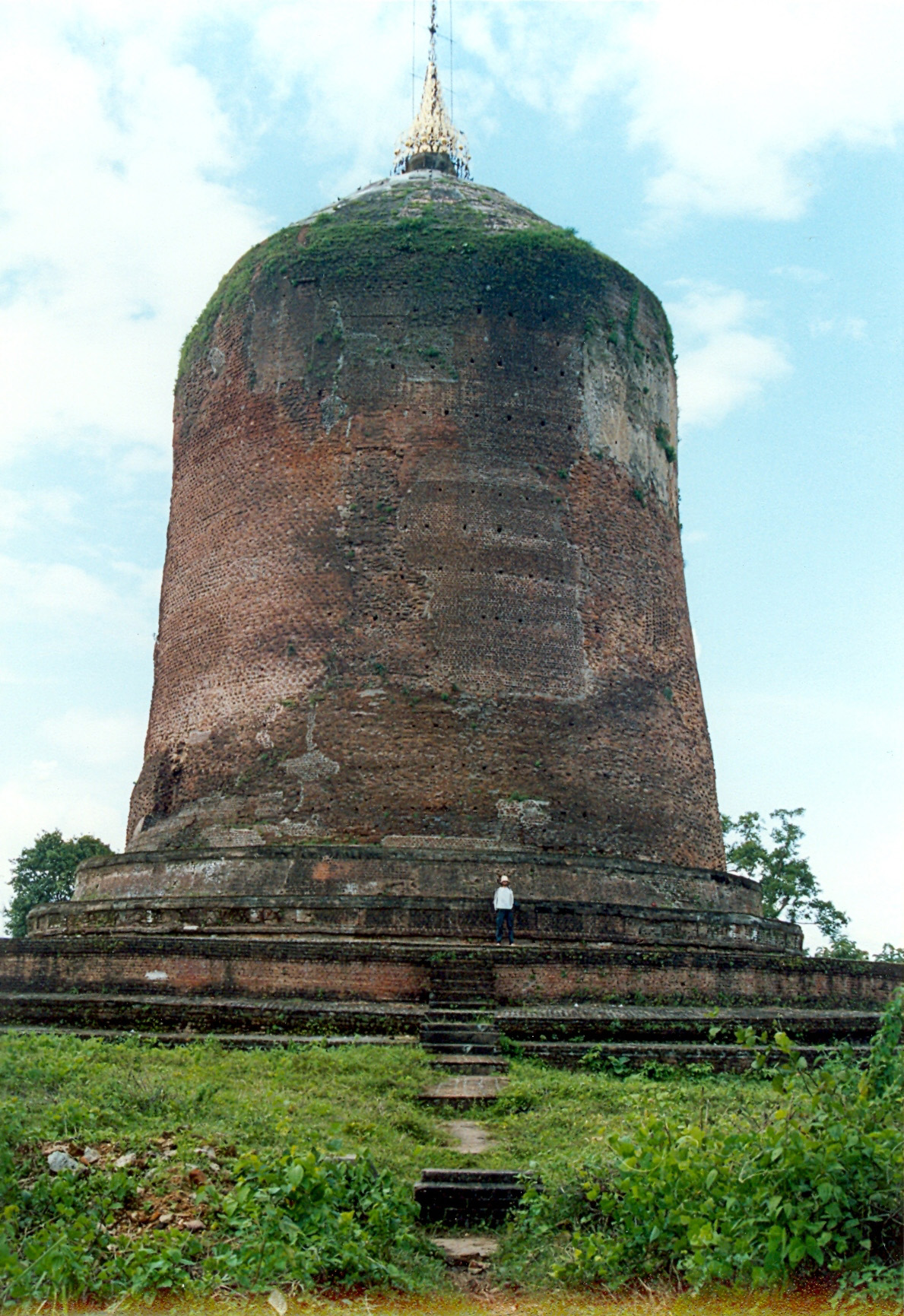
Bawbawgyi Pagoda is one of the earliest existing examples of a Burmese pagoda.

Burmese pagodas are stupas that typically house Buddhist relics, including relics associated with Buddha. Pagodas feature prominently in Myanmar's landscape, earning the country the moniker "land of pagodas." Several cities in the country, including Mandalay and Bagan, are known for their abundance of pagodas. Pagodas are the sites of seasonal pagoda festivals.

Burmese pagodas are enclosed in a compound known as the aran (အာရာမ်, from Pali ārāma), with gateways called mok (မုခ်, from Pali mukha) at the four cardinal directions. The platform surrounding a Burmese pagoda is called a yinbyin (ရင်ပြင်).

According to 2016 statistics compiled by the State Sangha Maha Nayaka Committee, Myanmar is home to 1,479 pagodas exceeding 27 feet (8.2 m) in height, a quarter of which are located in Sagaing Region.

1. Sagaing Region 372 (28.5%)
2. Kachin State 187 (14.3%)
3. Yangon Region 161 (12.3%)
4. Mandalay Region 157 (12.0%)
5. Magwe Region 97 (7.44%)
6. Ayeyarwady Region 78 (5.98%)
7. Kayin State 44 (3.37%)
8. Shan State 44 (3.37%)
9. Tanintharyi Region 40 (3.07%)
10. Mon State 34 (2.61%)
11. Rakhine State 26 (1.99%)
12. Chin State 24 (1.84%)
13. Kayah State 22 (1.69%)
14. Bago Region 18 (1.38%)

== Terms ==
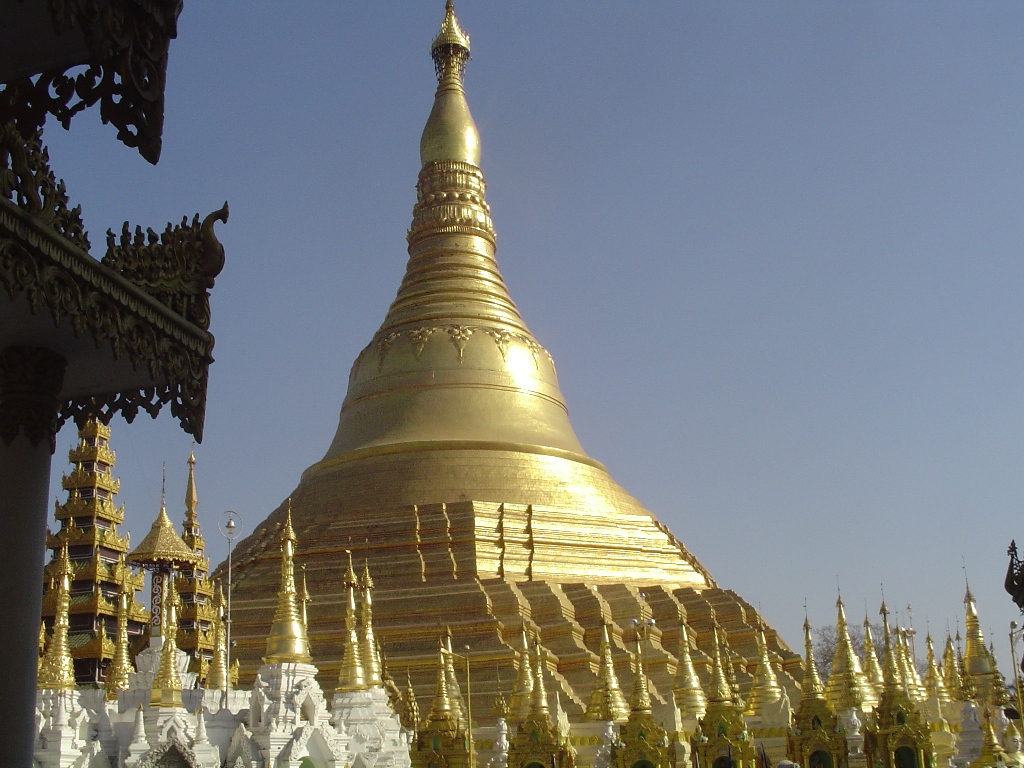
Shwedagon Pagoda in Yangon is Myanmar's most prominent zedi.

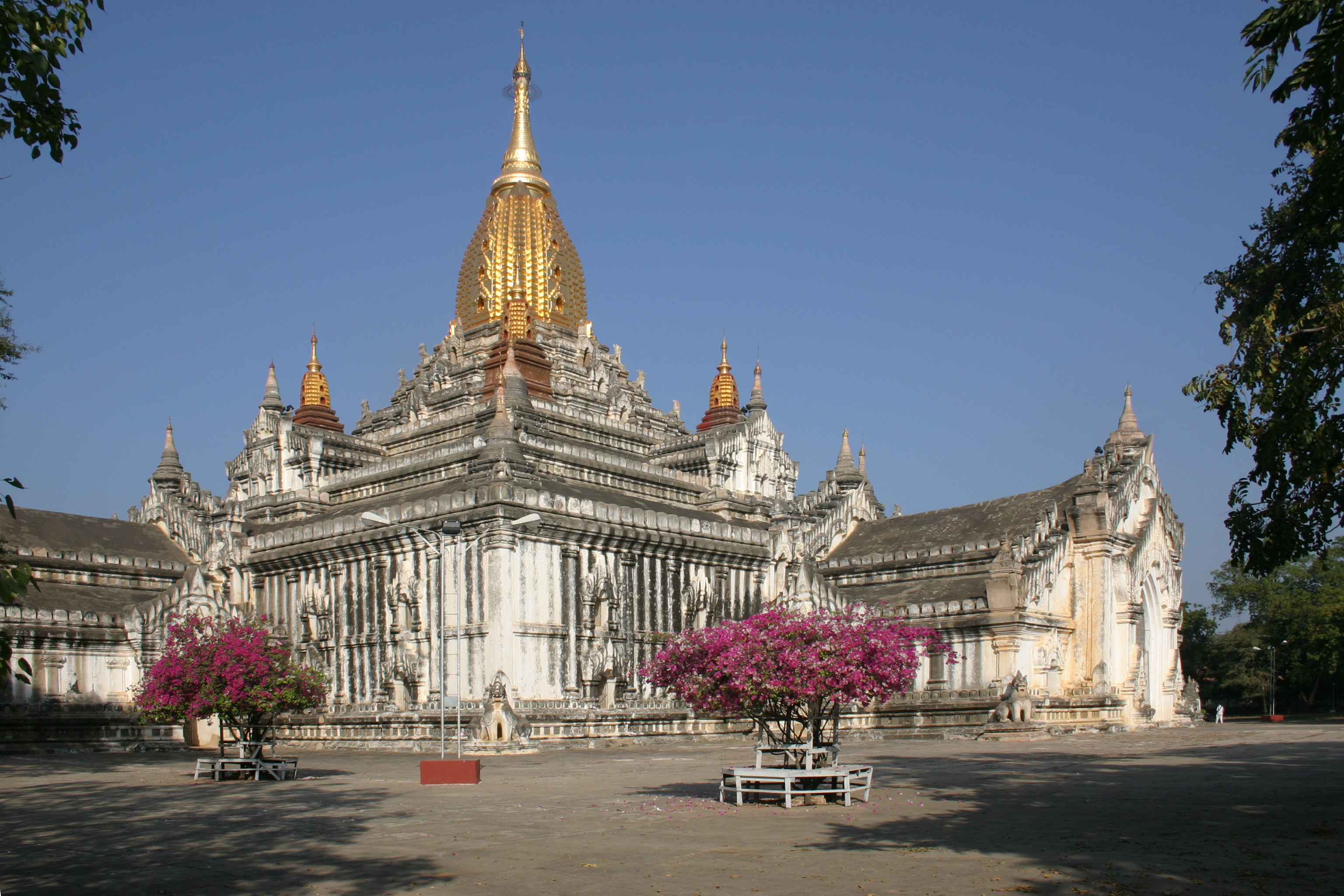
Ananda Temple in Bagan is a classic example of a pahto.

In the Burmese language, pagodas are known by various terms. The umbrella term phaya (ဘုရား, pronounced [pʰəjá]), which derives from Sanskrit vara, refers to pagodas, images of the Buddha, as well as royal and religious personages, including the Buddha, kings, and monks. Zedi ' (စေတီ), which derives from Pali cetiya, specifically refers to typically solid, bell-shaped stupas that may house relics. Pahto (ပုထိုး) refers to hollow square or rectangular buildings built to resemble caves, with chambers that house images of the Buddha. Burmese pagodas are distinguished from kyaungs in that the latter are monasteries that house Buddhist monks.

== Types ==
Burmese zedis are classified into four prevalent types:

1. Datu zedi (ဓာတုစေတီ, from Pali dhātucetiya) or datdaw zedi (ဓာတ်တော်စေတီ) - zedis enshrining relics of the Buddha or arhats
2. Paribawga zedi (ပရိဘောဂစေတီ, from Pali paribhogacetiya) - zedis enshrining garments and other items (alms bowls, robes, etc.) that belonged to the Buddha or sacred personages
3. Dhamma zedi (ဓမ္မစေတီ, from Pali dhammacetiya) - zedis enshrining sacred texts and manuscripts, along with jewels and precious metals
4. Odeiktha zedi (ဥဒ္ဒိဿစေတီ, from Pali uddissacetiya) - zedis built from motives of piety, containing statues of the Buddha, models of sacred images

Of the four classes, dhammazedis and udeikthazedis are the most prevalent, since they are routinely erected by donors as a work of merit. Burmese zedis are typically constructed with bricks, covered with whitewashed stucco. Prominent zedis are gilded with gold. Burmese zedis are crowned with a spired final ornament known as the hti, which is hoisted in a traditional ceremony (ထီးတော်တင်ပွဲ, htidaw tin pwe) that dates to the pre-colonial era.

== See also ==
- Buddhism in Myanmar
- Cetiya
- Awgatha
- Pagoda festival
- Dhamma Talaka Pagoda, Birmingham UK
- Global Vipassana Pagoda, Mumbai India
- Golden Pagoda, Arunachal Pradesh India
- Sand pagoda
- Stupas in Sri Lanka
- Relics associated with the Buddha
