= Pawnyang =

- Village
- Location in Burma
- Coordinates: 20°11′N 97°22′E
- Country: Burma
- State: Shan State
- District: Taunggyi District
- Township: Hsi Hseng Township
- Time zone: UTC+6.30 (MST)

Pawnyang is a village in Hsi Hseng Township, Taunggyi District, in the Shan State of eastern Burma. It is located to the east of the township capital of Hsi Hseng. It is located northeast of the town of Loisawn. It is a primary agricultural village, with extensive fields around it.
