= Tönghsöngkalo =

- Village
- Location in Burma
- Coordinates: 20°13′N 97°15′E
- Country: Burma
- State: Shan State
- District: Taunggyi District
- Township: Hsi Hseng Township
- Time zone: UTC+6.30 (MST)

Tönghsöngkalo is a village in Hsi Hseng Township, Taunggyi District, in the Shan State of eastern Burma. It is located just to the north of the township capital of Hsi Hseng along National Highway 5. It is primarily an agricultural village, with extensive fields located across the road west of the village.
