= Loisati =

- Village
- Location in Burma
- Coordinates: 20°7′N 97°16′E
- Country: Burma
- State: Shan State
- District: Taunggyi District
- Township: Hsi Hseng Township
- Time zone: UTC+6.30 (MST)

Loisati is a village in Hsi Hseng Township, Taunggyi District, in the Shan State of eastern Burma. It is located just to the north of Tongkaw off the National Highway 5.
