= Htisöm =

- Village
- Location in Burma
- Coordinates: 20°16′N 97°25′E
- Country: Burma
- State: Shan State
- District: Taunggyi District
- Township: Hsi Hseng Township
- Time zone: UTC+6.30 (MST)

Htisöm is a village in Hsi Hseng Township, Taunggyi District, in the Shan State of eastern Burma. It is located southeast of Loisawn, near Loimut. It is a primarily agricultural village with extensive fields surrounding it.
