= Veng-lek =

- Village
- Location in Burma
- Coordinates: 20°1′N 97°14′E
- Country: Burma
- State: Shan State
- District: Taunggyi District
- Township: Hsi Hseng Township
- Time zone: UTC+6.30 (MST)

Veng-lek is a village in Hsi Hseng Township, Taunggyi District, in the Shan State of eastern Burma. It is located to the south of Tongkaw along the National Highway 5. A river runs to the west of the village from north to south.
