= Tongkaw =

- Village
- Location in Burma
- Coordinates: 20°6′N 97°16′E
- Country: Burma
- State: Shan State
- District: Taunggyi District
- Township: Hsi Hseng Township
- Time zone: UTC+6.30 (MST)

Tongkaw is a village in Hsi Hseng Township, Taunggyi District, in the Shan State of eastern Burma. It is located south of the township capital of Hsi Hseng by National Highway 5. Kong Pyek is located further south along the road in Kayah State. An atrocity was committed in the village on 2 August 1984 by the 101st light infantry regiment.
