= Nawnge =

- Village
- Location in Burma
- Coordinates: 20°21′N 97°12′E
- Country: Burma
- State: Shan State
- District: Taunggyi District
- Township: Hsi Hseng Township
- Time zone: UTC+6.30 (MST)

Nawnge is a village in Hsi Hseng Township, Taunggyi District, in the Shan State of eastern Burma. It is located just west of the town of Loisawn. A road connects it to Lothkan and Nampan on the south shore of Inle Lake in the west.
