= Loimut =

- Village
- Location in Burma
- Coordinates: 20°17′N 97°19′E
- Country: Burma
- State: Shan State
- District: Taunggyi District
- Township: Hsi Hseng Township
- Time zone: UTC+6.30 (MST)

Loimut or Loi-put is a large village in Hsi Hseng Township, Taunggyi District, in the Shan State of eastern Burma. It is located just to the northeast of the township capital of Hsi Hseng and southeast by road from Loisawn. It is primarily an agricultural village, with extensive fields located around the village. There is a forested area to the northwest of the village.
