= Wān Kawngi =

Wān Kawngi Kawng-i
- Location in Burma
- Coordinates: 21°59′N 97°9′E
- Country: Burma
- Division: Shan State
- District: Taunggyi
- Township: Lawksawk
- Elevation: 805 m (2,641 ft)
- Time zone: UTC+6.30 (MST)

Wān Kawngi is a town in Shan State, Myanmar. It is part of Lawksawk Township of Taunggyi District.

== History ==
This town was visited by Sir George Scott in the 19th century.

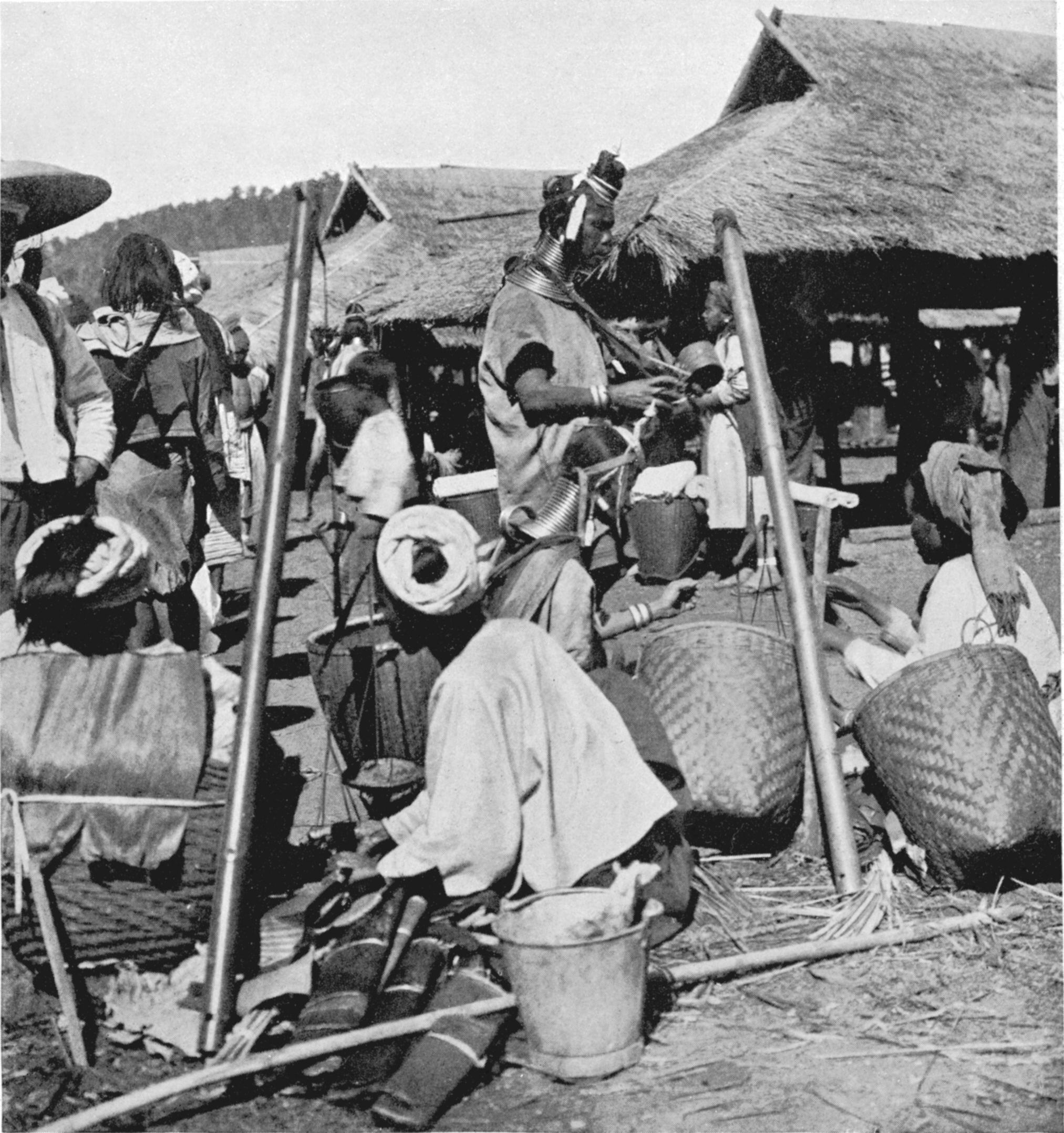
Market at Wan Kawngi in the late 19th century. Picture by Sir George Scott.
