= Lothkan =

- Village
- Location in Burma
- Coordinates: 20°23′N 97°6′E
- Country: Burma
- State: Shan State
- District: Taunggyi District
- Township: Taunggyi Township
- Time zone: UTC+6.30 (MST)

Lothkan is a village in Taunggyi Township, Taunggyi District, in the Shan State of eastern Burma. It is located west of the town of Loisawn. A road connects it to Nawnge in the east and Nampan on the south shore of Inle Lake in the west.
