= Hopin (disambiguation) =

Hopin, Kachin State is a town in Myanmar.

Hopin may also refer to:

- Hopin (company), a software company
- Hopin, Shan State, a village in Myanmar
- Hopin Academy, an educational organization in Ghana
