= Kunlon =

- Town
- Location in Burma
- Coordinates: 20°58′N 96°56′E
- Country: Myanmar
- State: Shan
- District: Taunggyi District
- Township: Taunggyi Township
- Time zone: UTC+6.30 (MST)

Kunlon is a small town in Taunggyi Township, Taunggyi District, Shan State, eastern Burma. It contains a lake and Kunlon Dam. It lies along National Road 43, north of Taunggyi and south of Yedwingyi.
