= Chaunggauk, Taunggyi Township =

Chaunggauk
- Village
- Location in Burma
- Coordinates: 20°51′54″N 97°01′00″E
- Country: Burma
- Region: Shan State
- District: Taunggyi
- Township: Taunggyi Township
- Time zone: UTC+6.30 (MST)

Chaunggauk is a village in Taunggyi Township, Taunggyi District, Shan State, of Burma (Myanmar). It lies to the north of the town of Taunggyi.
