= Hsohsa =

- Village
- Location in Burma
- Coordinates: 20°24′N 97°21′E
- Country: Burma
- State: Shan State
- District: Taunggyi District
- Township: Hsi Hseng Township
- Time zone: UTC+6.30 (MST)

Hsohsa is a village in Hsi Hseng Township, Taunggyi District, in the Shan State of eastern Burma. It is located northeast of the town of Loisawn. It is a primary agricultural village, with extensive fields around it. The village is named after Hso Hsa Hpa, a ruler of ancient Shan who was the son of Sao Pet Law.
