= Nawnghkathpa =

- Village
- Location in Burma
- Coordinates: 20°23′N 97°12′E
- Country: Burma
- State: Shan State
- District: Taunggyi District
- Township: Hsi Hseng Township
- Time zone: UTC+6.30 (MST)

Nawnghkathpa is a village in Hsi Hseng Township, Taunggyi District, in the Shan State of eastern Burma. It is located northwest of the town of Loisawn. It is a primarily agricultural village with extensive fields surrounding it and a small lake.
