= Khun Thein Pe =

Burmese politician

Member of the Pyithu Hluttaw
- Incumbent
- Assumed office 31 January 2011
- Constituency: Hopong

Member of the Amyotha Hluttaw
- Incumbent
- Assumed office 1 February 2016
- Constituency: Shan State No.9
- Majority: 150651 votes

Personal details
- Born: 28 October 1966 (age 59) Taunggyi Township, Shan State, Burma (Myanmar)
- Party: Pa-O National Organization
- Spouse: Nan Nu Htwe
- Parent(s): U Kyut (father); Nan Ki (mother)
- Education: Fourth Year Law
- Alma mater: Yangon University B.Sc(Botany)
- Occupation: Politician

Khun Thein Pe (Burmese: ခွန်သိန်းဖေ, born 28 October 1966) is a Burmese politician currently serving as a House of Nationalities MP for Shan State No. 9 constituency.

In the 2010 Myanmar general election, he was elected as a Pyithu Hluttaw MP for Hopong parliamentary constituency. He is a member of Pa-O National Organisation.

== Early life and education ==
He was born on 28 October 1966 in Taunggyi Township, Shan State, Burma (Myanmar) and graduated with B.Sc(Botany) from Yangon University. His previous job was Pyithu Hluttaw MP.

== Political career ==
He is a member of the Pa-O National Organisation. In the Myanmar general election, 2015, he was elected as an Amyotha Hluttaw MP, winning a majority of 150651 votes and elected representative from Shan State No. 9 parliamentary constituency.
