= Anders Midtgaard =

Danish entrepreneur, speaker, and artist

Anders Midtgaard is a Danish entrepreneur, speaker and artist. He is the co-founder of Hopin Academy, a Non-profit educational organization based in Tamale, Ghana.

== Public speaker ==
Anders Midtgaard is also a speaker on issues related to learning, idea-generation and creativity.

== Artist ==
As a musician, artist and filmmaker, Anders Midtgaard has worked in Denmark, Estonia, and the United States. His works were in a 2015 exhibition on surveillance at the Nave Gallery in Somerville, Massachusetts.
