= National Highway 4 (Myanmar) =

Road in Myanmar

National Highway 4
- အမှတ် 4 ပြည်ထောင်စုလမ်းမကြီး
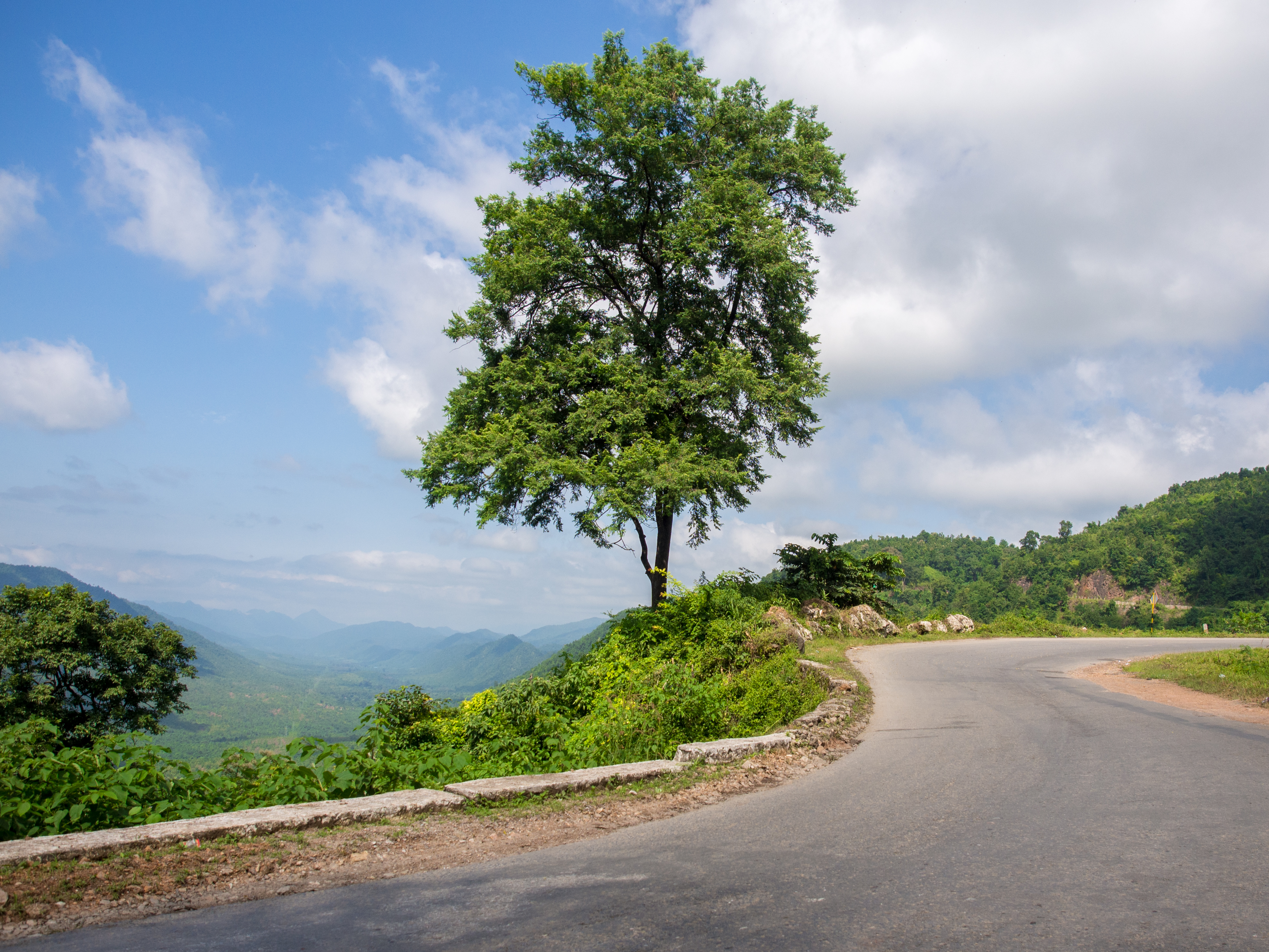

Route information
- Part of AH2

Major junctions
- West end: Meiktila
- East end: Tachileik

Location
- Country: Myanmar
- Major cities: Thazi, Kalaw, Taunggyi, Kengtung

Highway system
- Transport in Myanmar

National Highway 4 (NH4) is an important west–east flowing highway of central Burma. It connects the town of Meiktila in the Mandalay Region to Tachileik in Shan State in the east on the border with Thailand ( where it meets Thailand Route 1 ). The highway begins near Meiktila at 20°52′22″N 95°52′59″E where it is linked by the National Highway 1 coming from the south and at Hopong it meets National Highway 5 which goes south at 20°48′2″N 97°10′25″E.

The highway ends at Tachileik at 20°26′40″N 99°52′50″E.
