= Kong Pyek =

- Town
- Location in Burma
- Coordinates: 19°52′49″N 97°13′46″E
- Country: Burma
- State: Kayah State
- District: Loikaw District
- Township: Loikaw Township
- Time zone: UTC+6.30 (MST)

Kong Pyek is a small town in Loikaw Township, Loikaw District, in the northern part of Kayah State of eastern Burma. It is located south of Tongkaw in Shan State along National Highway 5.
