= Hopin, Shan State =

Hopin
- Location in Burma
- Coordinates: 21°13′44″N 96°52′41″E
- Country: Burma (Myanmar)
- Division: Shan State
- Districts: Taunggyi
- Township: Lawksawk

Population
  - Religions: Buddhism
- Time zone: UTC+6.30 (MST)

Hopin) is a village in Taunggyi District of Shan State of Myanmar. The village is about 5 kilometers south of the town of Lawksawk on the right (south-eastern) bank the Zawgyi River.
