= Taunggyi Hot Air Balloon Festival =

Traditional festival in Myanmar

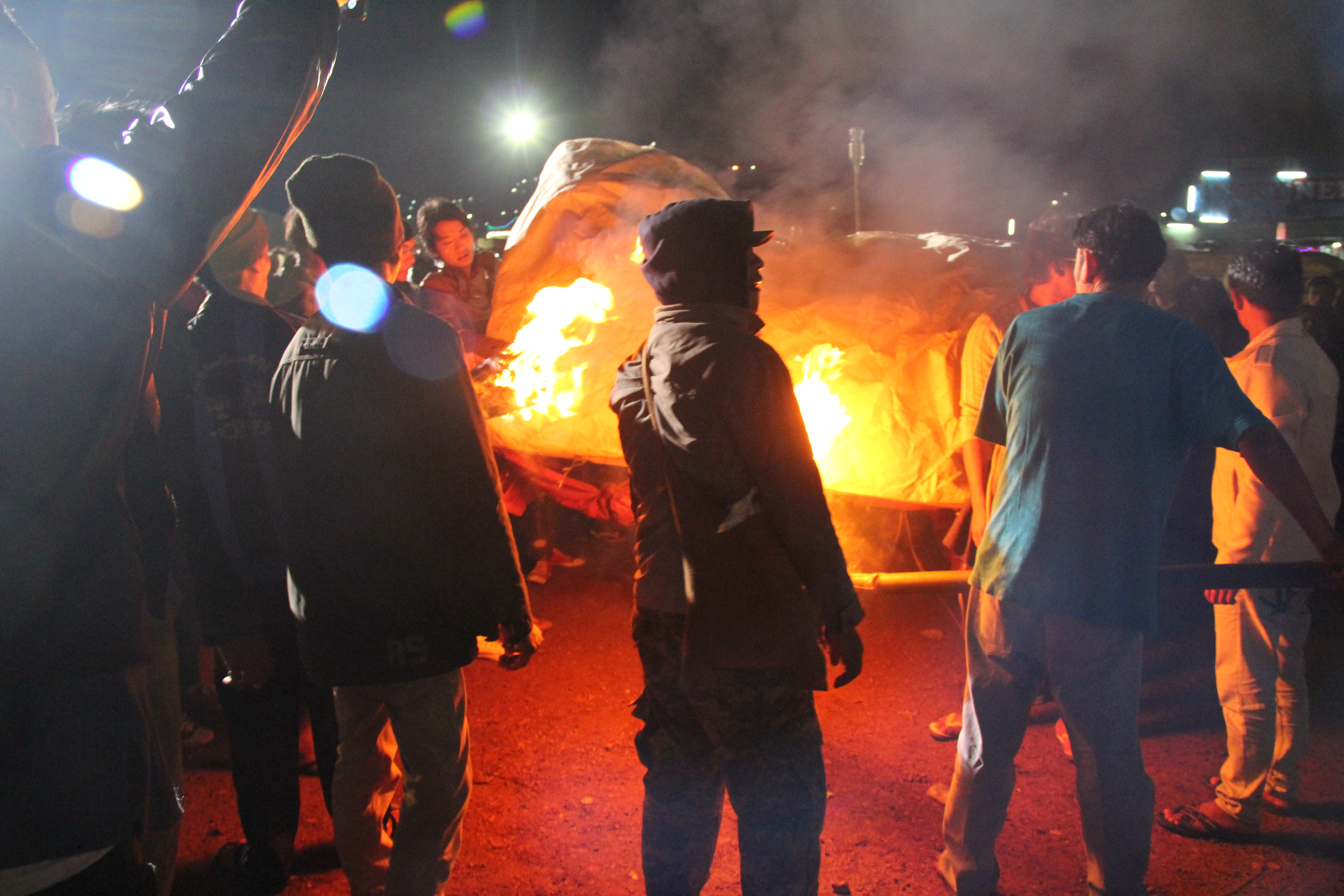
Taunggyi Hot Air Balloon Festival

Taunggyi Hot Air Balloon Festival (Burmese: တောင်ကြီးမီးပုံးပျံပွဲတော် MLCTS: Taunggyi mee pone pyan pwe daw ) also known as Taunggyi Tazaungdaing Festival is held on the full moon day of Tazaungmon, which is the eighth month of the traditional Burmese calendar. It is remarked as one of the Burmese traditional festivals, celebrated yearly in Taunggyi, the capital city of Shan State, Myanmar. The festival was first established with Buddhist religious meaning and changed into the traditional handicraft hot air balloon competition nowadays. While at the beginning of the festival, there was only one balloon participating, year by year the number of balloons increased, and today over 400 balloons take part. People from various religions participate in the festival, revealing a combination of traditional beliefs. This year, The Association of Traditional Hot Air Balloon Artists in Southern Shan State (Burmese: ရှမ်းပြည်နယ်‌‌ောင်ပိုင်းမီးပုံးပျံပညာရှင်များအသင်း MLCTS: Shan Pyi Nal dong pai mee pone pyan pyinnyashin myar a thin ) says it will be hosted from the 29th of October to 5th of November at Awayar Field (Burmese: အ ‌ေရာကွင်း MLCTS: Awayar Kwin).

== History ==
The story of the Taunggyi Hot Air Balloon Festival is rooted in the beliefs in Buddhist and Hindu cosmology. The local people released the decorated hot air balloons towards heaven to drive away the evil spirits and get the lucky fortune. Initially, the festival started as a small event with just a few local participants who released hot air balloons as offerings to The Buddha.

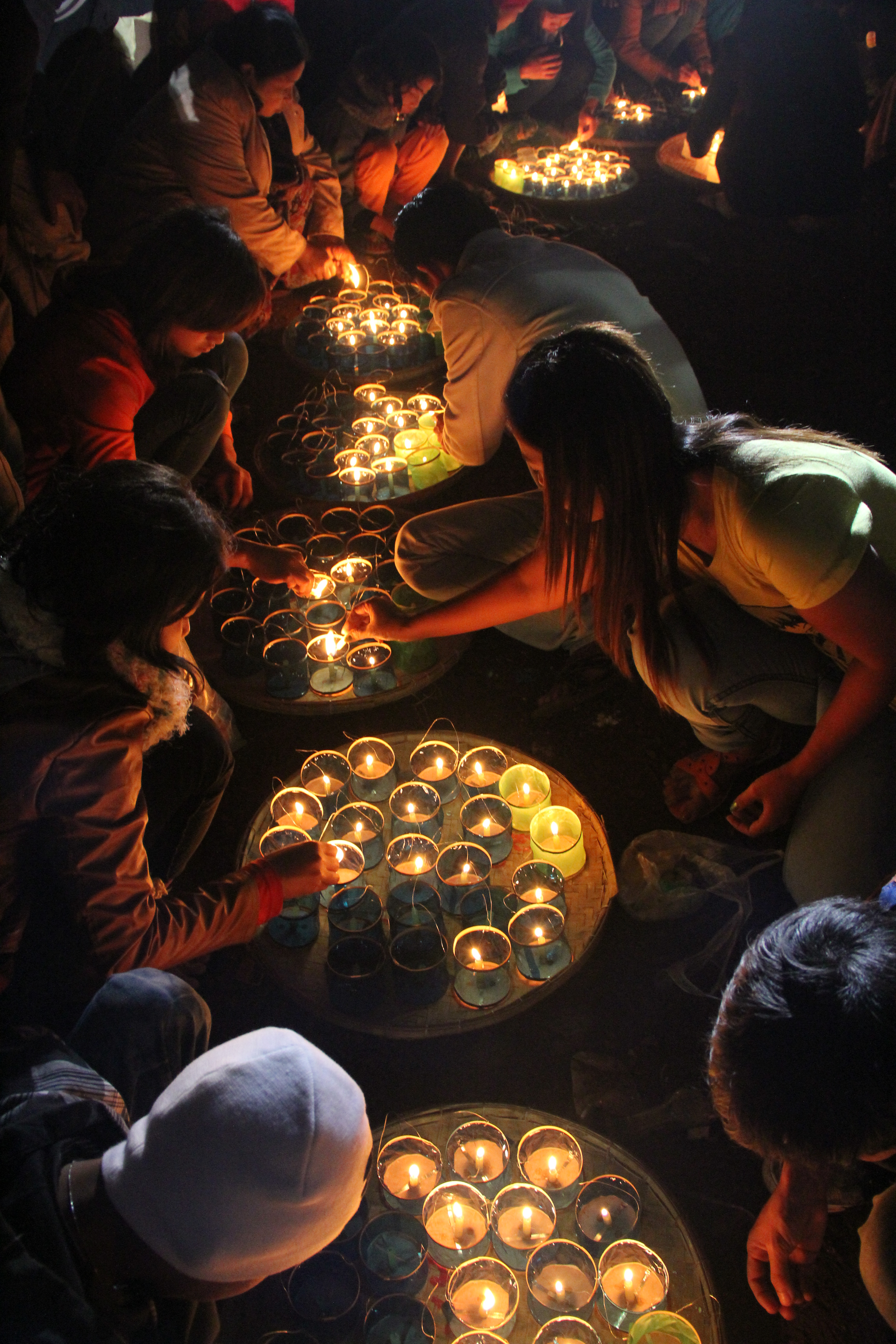
Lighting Candles on the full moon day of Tazaung Mon

In Taunggyi, the capital of Shan State, the “Taunggyi Tazaung Daing Festival” has been held for a long time. Taunggyi City was founded in 1894 during the British-Burma era. At that time, the Hot Air Balloon festival was not widely celebrated except for lighting candles, Fireworks, and firecrackers. It has been noted that the people living in Taunggyi during that time used to light firecrackers to expel evils from the village.

In ancient times, candles used during the festival were made of gooseberry wood and, people attempted to offer the candles as much as possible symbolising reverence for the Buddha, despite their inability to reach heaven, inspiring a sense of sacredness. To overcome this, fire balloons are started to be used instead of candles, representing the homage to the Buddha.

During the Tazaungmon month, people offer Hot-air balloons to the Buddha, who descended from the land of Trāyastriṃśa Heaven to the mortal world. Moreover, the intention of releasing hot-air balloons into the sky is also considered an offering to pay homage to the Sulamani Pagoda founded by Śakra (Buddhism), lord of heaven.

The first hot-air balloon was launched in Taunggyi a year before World War II. In the year 1303 of Burmese Calendar, a large balloon made of linen was lit up under the leadership of the Head Monk of Konetha Monastery in Taunggyi. About 40 sets of 40 yards of Linen sew the balloon. The first balloon, approximately 50 feet in diameter, was bigger than the modern balloons. Bags of rice, oil bottles, steel lunch boxes, umbrellas, coins, clothes and other utensils were hung on the wall of the balloon. Besides these items, paper statues of the 4 guardian gods who guard the world against evil forces were also hung on the side wall. Each guardian god grasps 25 Myanmar Kyats on their hands as a sign of spreading wealth to the world. People were following along the way of the balloon to pick up the coins and utensils falling from the sky. In the British-Burma era, balloons were lit up in large numbers, and fireworks were also found in almost every house. People believe it brings good luck if the balloon goes up.

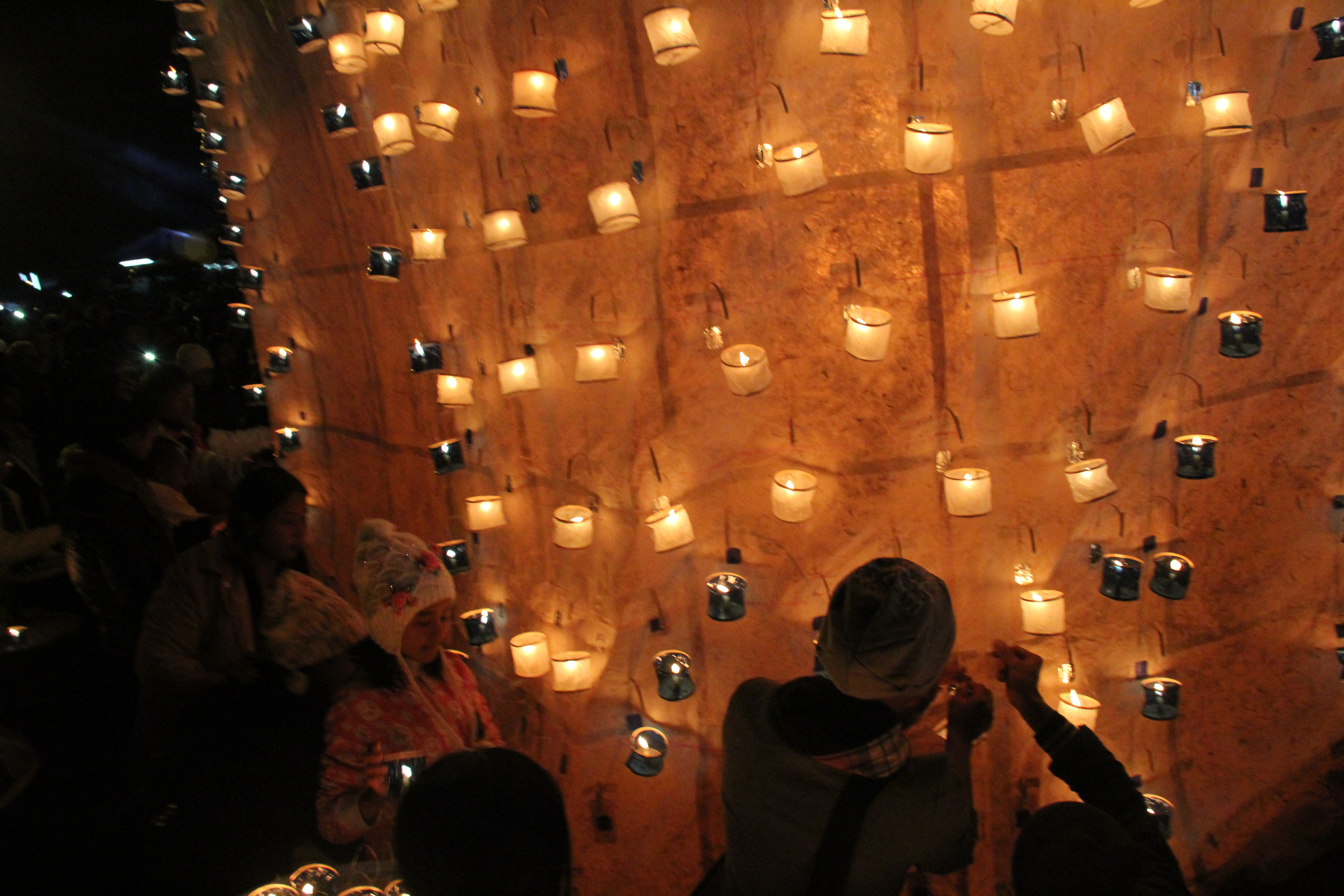
The wall of the Hot Air balloon is decorated with thousands of lanterns

In 1945, the “OurDay” fun fair was held in Taunggyi. Throughout the entire week, people came to the event area to see the live music show and amusement parks and also to try the traditional foods. The night market fun fair saw enthusiastic participation from diverse communities across the city, with people bringing along vibrant lanterns and tiny hot-air balloons to make the event even more colourful and lively. These balloons are not attached to the Gunpowder or lanterns, they are just ordinary balloons.

In later years, the neighbourhood continued the fireworks, and fire-crackers, bringing candles to the city centre temple, hanging colourful lanterns on the bamboo trees, and lifting hot-air balloons in the night market as usual. Since the neighbourhood participated in the fun fair every year, making the lanterns and hot-air balloons more beautiful and vibrant than others, they started competing and eventually changing into a chandelier competition.

== Hot Air Balloon Preparation ==
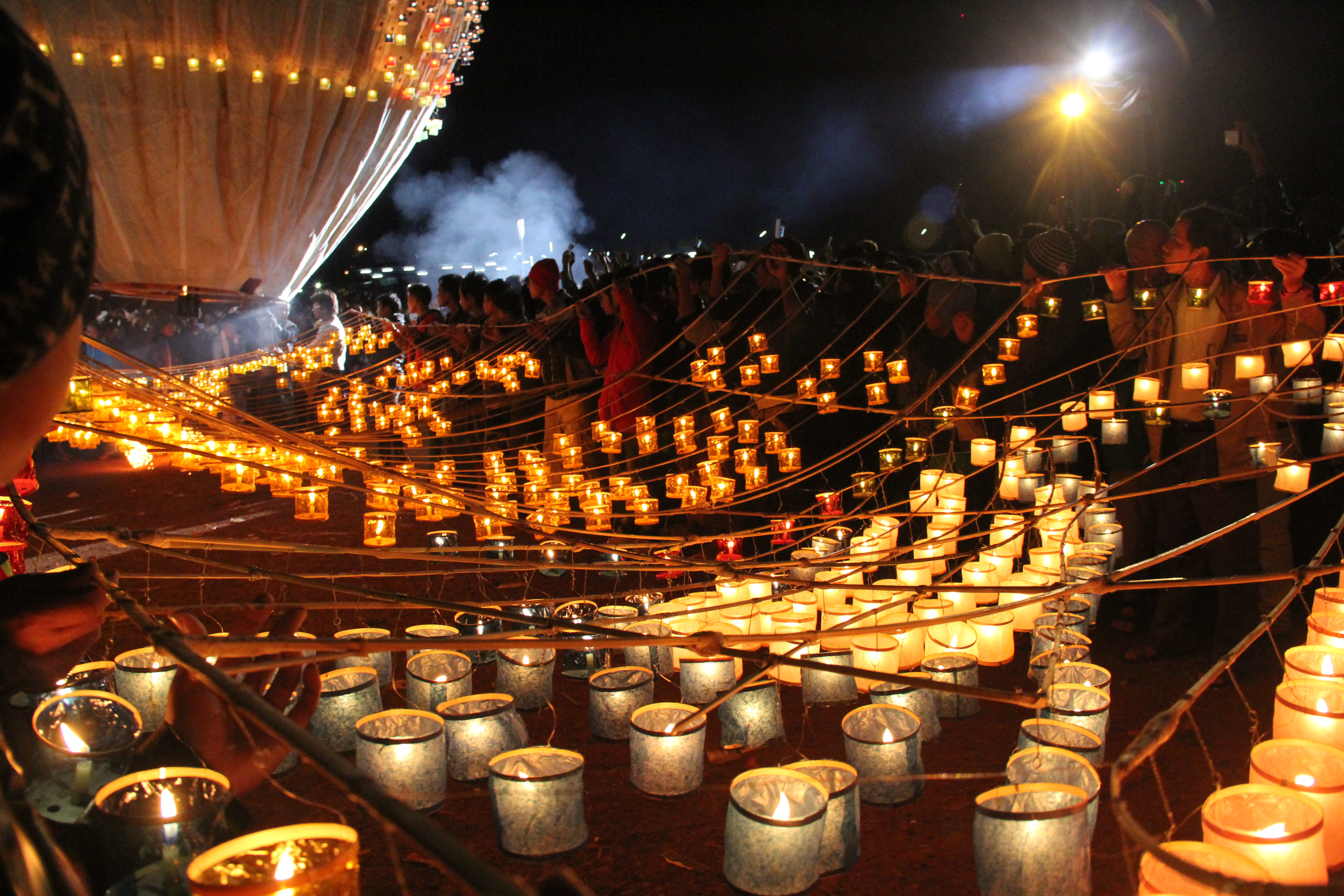
Myanmar people holding lanterns to attach to the wall of the Hot Air Balloon

Hot-air balloons hold a significant cultural role for Myanmar people. They are very expensive to build and it takes about 5 to 6 months to prepare the balloons before the competition. The participants spend a lot of time and money on decorating the balloons with paints and fireworks. The strength and greatness of a balloon show teamwork and enthusiasm. Modern hot-air balloons are made of Shan paper. They are all designed and hand-made by the participants.

All the decorations on the balloons such as candles, lanterns, paintings and even the fireworks are made by hand. Many colourful lanterns made of Cellophane and thousands of red, yellow and white candles illustrating different patterns are attached to the wall of the paper balloon before being released them into the starry night sky. Participants illustrate the artwork on their balloons from images of Buddha to traditional motifs, symmetrical patterns or shapes of animals such as bears, parrots, elephants, lions, tigers and dragons on the mulberry papers.

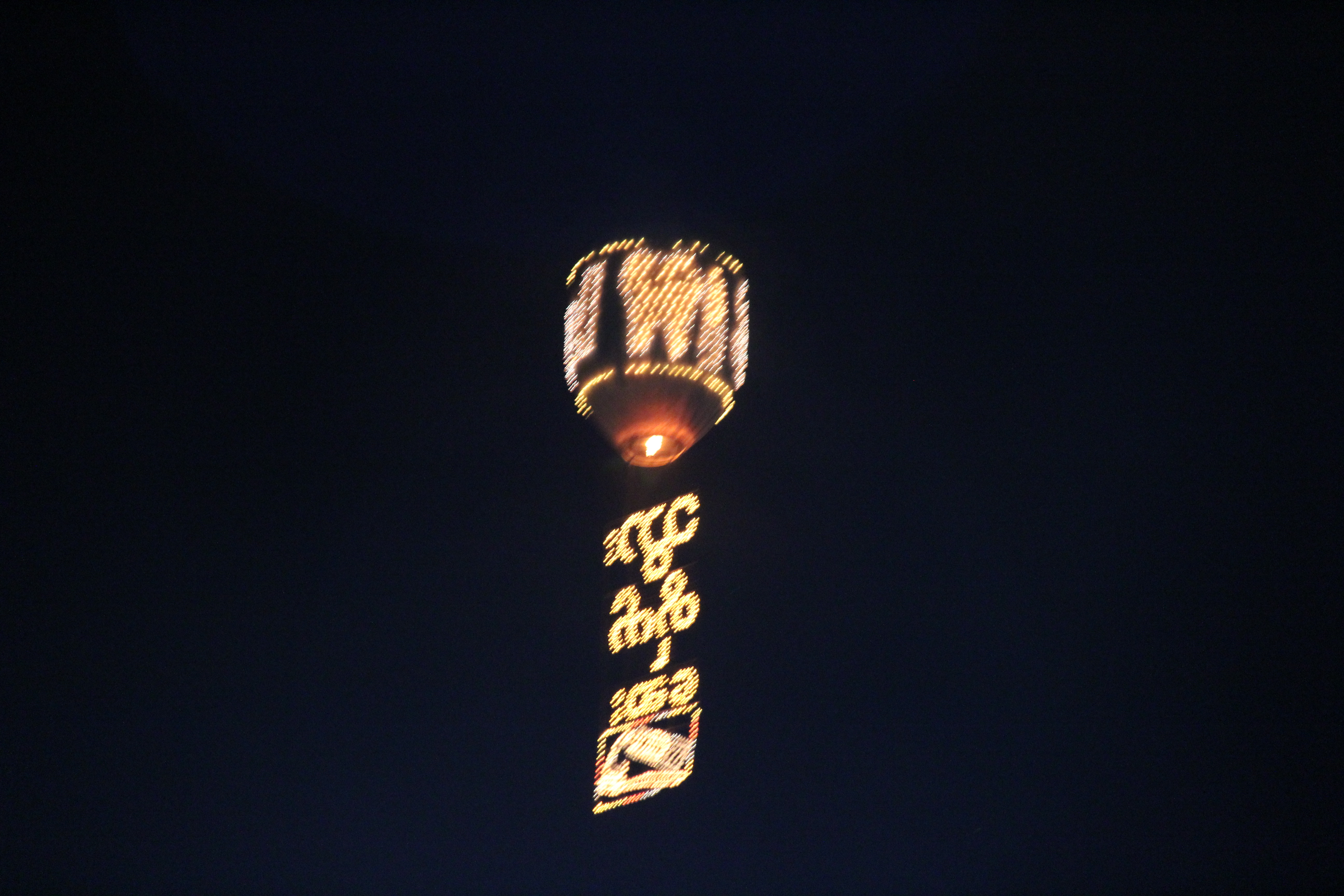
The balloon in the sky is decorated with candles and lanterns in different patterns

The body of the balloons is made in the shape of papaya or melon and the height is about 18 to 25 feet. The “Sein-na-pann” balloon has to be hanged with thousands of lanterns on its body. The lanterns in patterns of Buddha images reveal the Ten Great Birth Stories of Gautama, The Buddha. But “Nya Mee Kyi” balloons are attached with fireworks weighing 40 pounds of gunpowder.

== Hot Air Balloon Competition ==
The hot air balloon competition goes on all day long and until late at night, providing an opportunity for various villages and families from the surrounding region to exhibit their homemade hot air balloon creations. In the daytime, the show is focused on the children, featuring large balloons fashioned into animal shapes, ranging from birds to tigers and elephants. The sky is filled with hot-air balloons, mostly representing traditional Myanmar and cartoon figures, popular among kids and adults. In the evening, the festival comes alive with the exciting main hot-air balloon competition. These balloons are decorated with hundreds of candles and fireworks attached at the bottom are lighted once they fly into the sky.

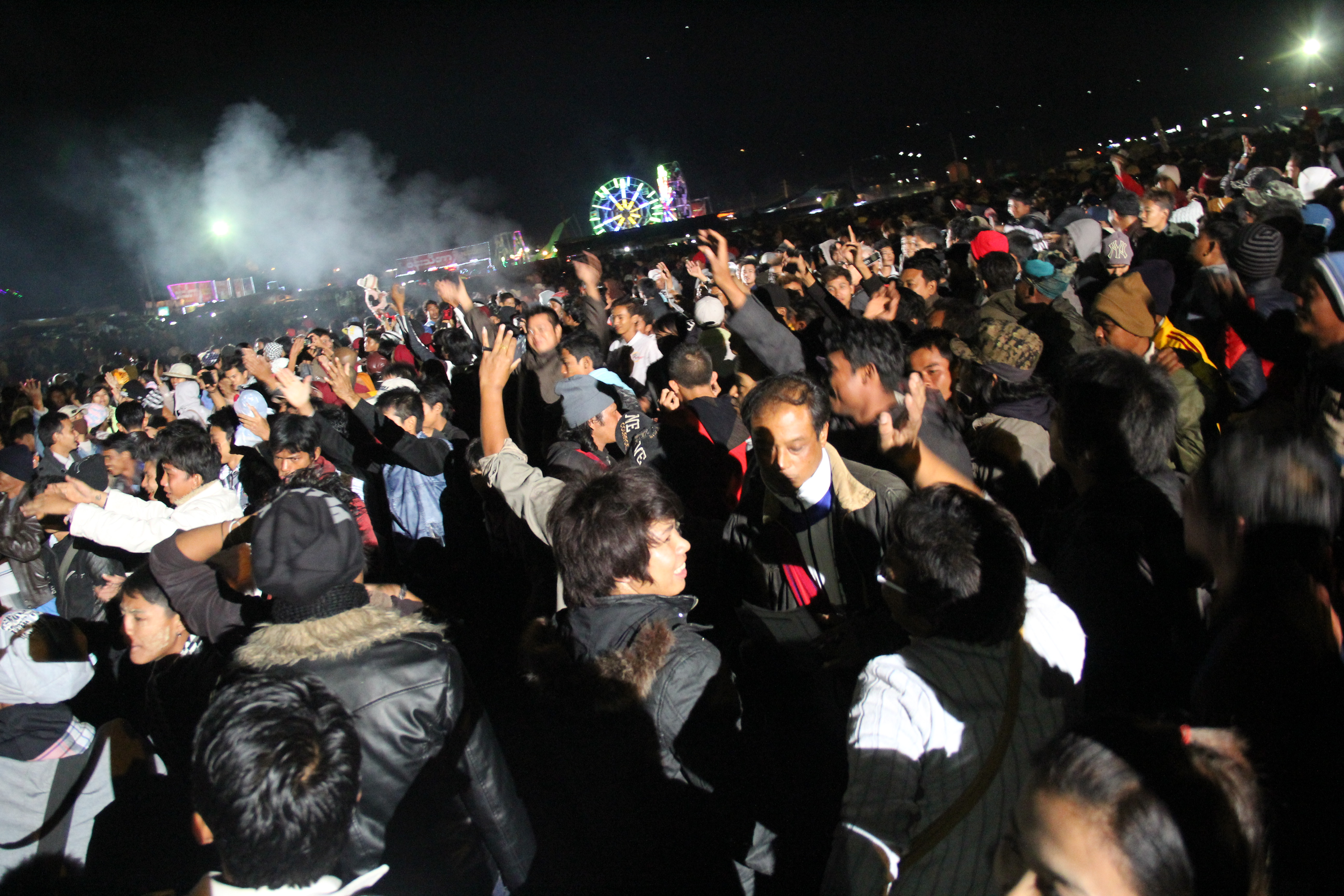
Thousands of people celebrating the Hot Air Balloon Festival held in Taunggyi, Shan State, Myanmar

When the night falls, villagers take turns to release their huge balloons. The huge hot air balloons are decorated with several candles and they are flown up into the sky. They are attached to fireworks and explode in the night sky, making the sky vibrant with colourful lights. The Taunggyi Balloon Festival features two types of balloons:

- Seinnapan : These balloons are made of paper and stand 4–6 meters tall. They are decorated with colourful cellophane lanterns that light up in beautiful patterns around the body of the balloon. The hot air inside the balloons makes them rise quickly.
- Meekyi : These balloons are 3–5 meters tall and are loaded with fireworks that explode in amazing, multicoloured displays that can last up to 15 minutes.

Each team launches four or five balloons simultaneously. The rule dictates that if even one balloon catches fire and burns, the entire team’s effort is disqualified. This highlights the importance of teamwork and precise execution in achieving success. In competition, each balloon team consists of up to a hundred members. Once the balloon flew into the sky, all team members began to jump, dance and shout with joy while watching as their balloon rose high and floated away.

== Regional Traditions ==
- Pyin Oo Lwin - Thousands of people have gathered in the hills of central Myanmar for the annual Tazaungdaing light festival marking the end of the rainy season with a display of exploding hot-air balloons.
- Kalaw - The hill station town of Kalaw hosts its festival, featuring not only hot air balloons but also various fiery attractions and festivities.
