= Shan State Cultural Museum =

Cultural museum in Myanmar

- Established: 1974
- Location: Taunggyi, Shan State, Myanmar
- Coordinates: 20°46′15″N 97°02′22″E
- Type: Cultural Museum
- Accreditation: Ministry of Religious Affairs and Culture (Myanmar)

The Shan State Cultural Museum, also known as Cultural Museum (Taunggyi), is a museum located on Bogyoke Aung San Road and Eintawshay Road in Taunggyi, Shan State, Myanmar (Burma). It is one of the cultural museums operating under the Department of Archaeology and National Museum, part of the Ministry of Religious Affairs and Culture. Established in 1974, the museum displays divans, swords, fans, and chairs once used by the sawbwa (Shan chieftains of former times), along with old paintings, coins, and traditional costumes of the Shan peoples.

== History ==
The institution was initially organized as the Shan State Cultural Department on 27 June 1956, exhibiting cultural objects at the Shan State office. Following a new administrative system in 1974, it was transferred to the Cultural Institute Department and formally inaugurated as the Cultural Museum in its current building on 11 May 1974.

== Displays ==
The museum houses a total of 5,998 objects in its collection, with 808 display objects exhibited across four exhibition rooms.

The museum is a two-story brick building with a display area of approximately 11,200 square feet (1,040 m^{2}). It features four exhibition rooms. In total, 880 artifacts are showcased in these rooms.

=== Ground floor ===
The reception hall features a 10-by-10-foot (3.0 m × 3.0 m) map of Shan State, the largest state in eastern Myanmar, which is divided into three regions: east, south, and north.

Exhibition Room (1) and Exhibition Room (2) are located on the ground floor. Exhibition Room (1) displays the traditional costumes and musical instruments of various Shan nationalities. Shan State is home to over 30 distinct Shan nationalities, each possessing unique cultures. Exhibition Room (2) showcases their intangible cultural heritage, including traditional arts and crafts such as weaving, lacquerware, glazed ware, and traditional Shan paper, accompanied by explanatory texts.

=== First floor ===
Exhibition Room (3) and Exhibition Room (4) are on the first floor. Exhibition Room (3) highlights the Panglong Agreement, a pivotal event for both Shan State and Myanmar. Signed on 12 February 1947, by General Aung San and leaders of Myanmar's nationalities in Pinlon, Shan State, the agreement reflected their collective desire for independence from British rule. This room features a large 5-by-8-foot (1.5 m × 2.4 m) oil painting illustrating the signing, a copy of the agreement, and photographs of the signatory leaders with their biographies. Additionally, colorful paintings depicting the traditional cultures of various nationalities are displayed.

Exhibition Room (4) is dedicated to the literature of the Shan nationality, showcasing palm-leaf manuscripts and paper parchments, along with photographs and biographies of Shan poets. The room also demonstrates the deep Buddhist faith of the Shan people through displays of Buddha images made from bronze, wood, lacquer, and clay, as well as traditional utensils used for offering alms in monasteries. Furthermore, ancient artifacts representing the successive historical periods that flourished in Shan State are exhibited.
