= Loisawn =

Sike Khaung သုဲင်ꩻခဝ် Sai Kaow
- Village
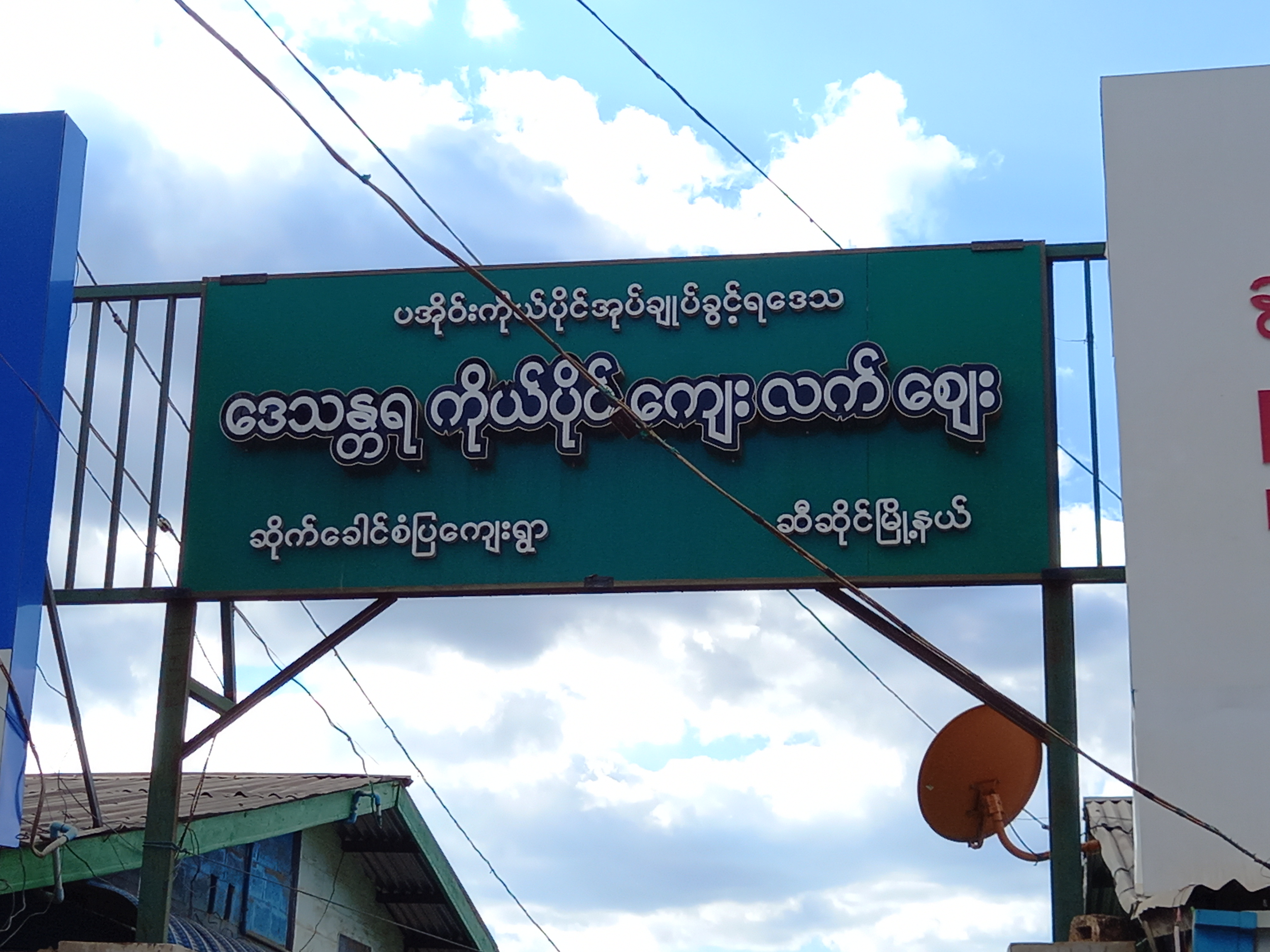
- Sai Khao Market sign board

- Location in Burma
- Coordinates: 20°20′N 97°15′E
- Country: Burma
- State: Shan State
- District: Taunggyi District
- Township: Hsi Hseng Township
- Time zone: UTC+6.30 (MST)

Sike Khaung or Sai Khao (Pa'o Karen: သုဲင်ꩻခဝ်) is a village in Hsi Hseng Township, Taunggyi District, Pa'O Self-Administered Zone, in the Shan State of eastern Myanmar. It is located north of the township capital of Hsi Hseng by National Highway 5. Nawnge and Lothkan are located to the west, Loimut to the southeast, and Hsohsa to the northeast.
