= Ayethaya =

Aye Tharyar Aye Tharyar New Town; Taunggyi New Town ဝဵင်းဢေးတႃႇယႃႇ ဝေင်ꩻခွꩻသာႏယာႏ
- Urban ward / New town
- Aye Tharyar Ward
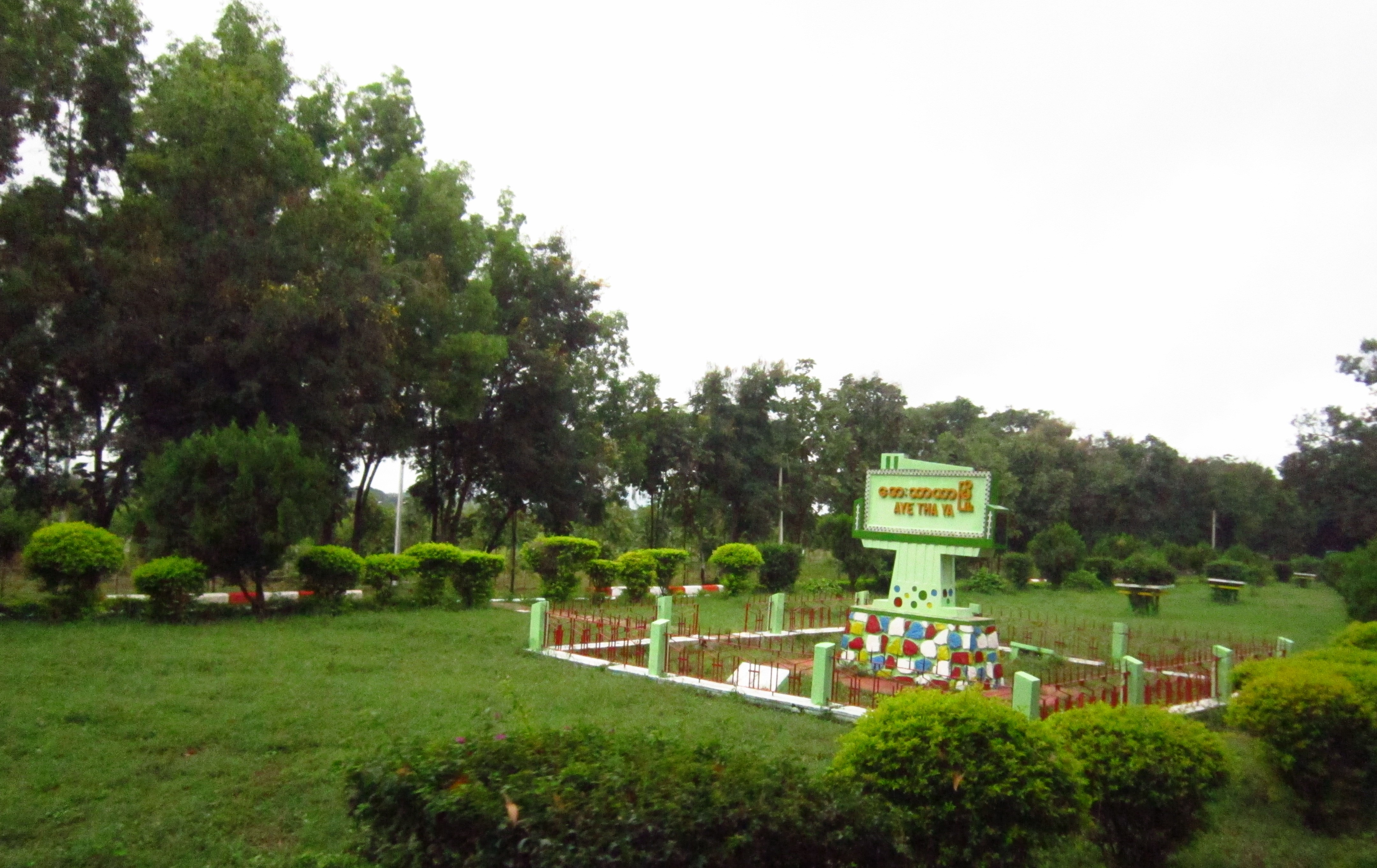
- Panoramic view of Aye Tharyar New Town

- Location within Myanmar
- Coordinates: 20°46′38″N 96°59′56″E
- Country: Myanmar
- State: Shan State
- District: Taunggyi District
- Township: Taunggyi Township
- Established: December 1989
- Elevation: 1,170 m (3,840 ft)
- Time zone: UTC+6:30 (MST)

AyeTharyar (အေးသာယာ), also known as Aye Tharyar New Town, is a major urban ward and satellite town located in Taunggyi Township, Taunggyi District, southern Shan State, Myanmar. It was established in December 1989 as an urban expansion project intended to alleviate population density in downtown Taunggyi. Although administratively integrated as one of the constituent wards of Taunggyi, it functions geographically as a distinct satellite corridor town.

Following administrative reorganizations of the Taunggyi metropolitan boundaries, Aye Tharyar is officially designated as the 15th municipal ward out of the 21 urban wards comprising Taunggyi.

All administrative and municipal services within the ward are directly managed by the Taunggyi Township General Administration Department (GAD) and the Taunggyi Development Committee (TMDC). Consequently, it remains an integral urban component of the greater metropolitan area of Taunggyi rather than a stand-alone independent municipality.
