= Taunggyi Township =

Township in the Shan State of Myanmar

- Township
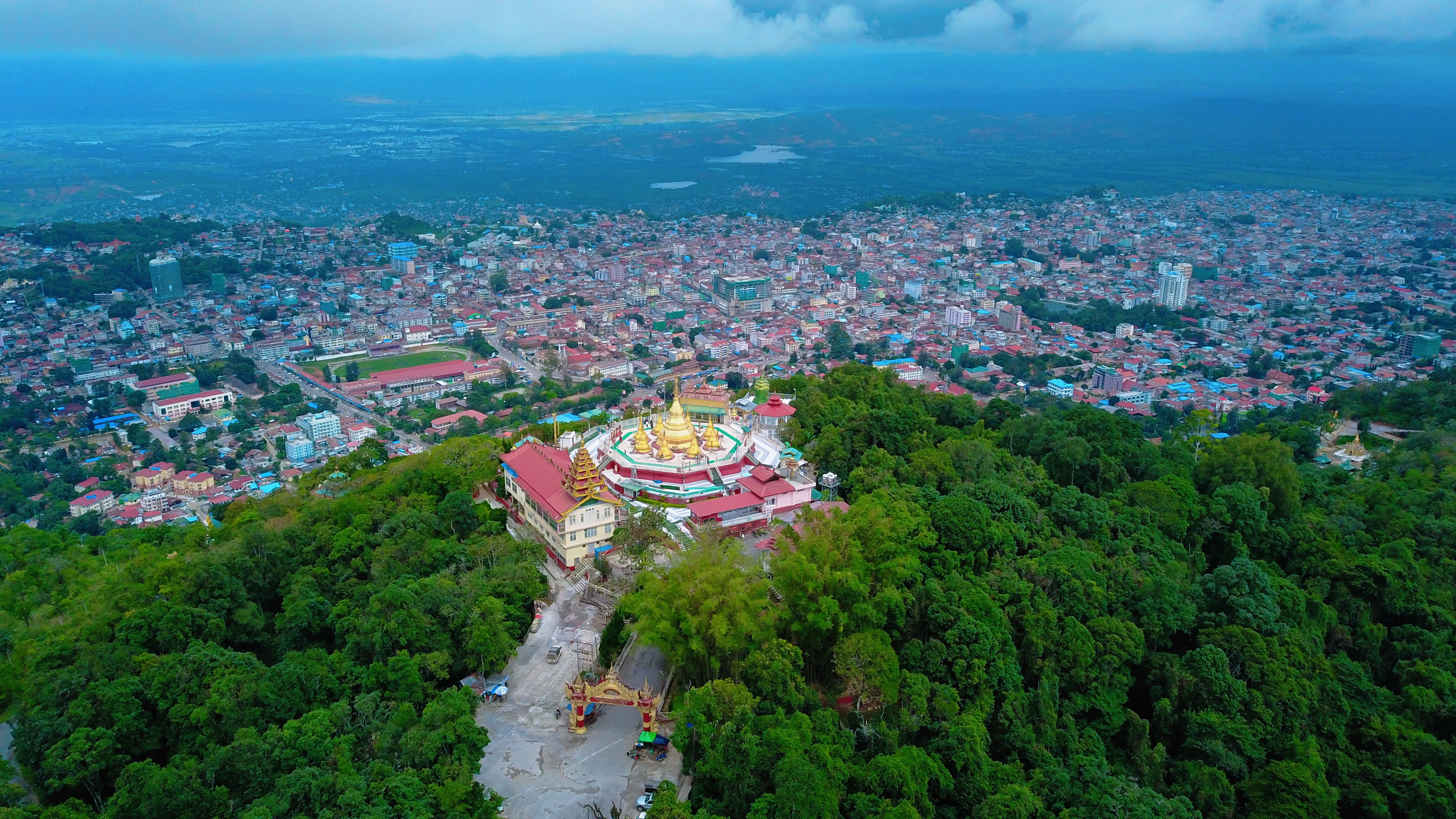
- Shwe Bhone Pwint Pagoda and Taunggyi

- Location in Taunggyi district
- Coordinates: 20°47′N 97°02′E
- Country: Myanmar
- State: Shan State
- District: Taunggyi District
- Capital: Taunggyi

Area
  - Total: 420.9 sq mi (1,090.0 km^{2})

Population (2014)
  - Total: 381,639
  - Density: 906.83/sq mi (350.13/km^{2})
- Time zone: UTC+6:30 (MMT)

Taunggyi Township is a township of Taunggyi District in the Shan State of Myanmar. The principal town is Taunggyi.

== Borders ==
Taunggyi Township is bordered by the following townships:

- Lawksawk to the north
- Hopong to the north and east
- Hsi Hseng to the east and south
- Nyaungshwe (Yawunghwe) to the west
- Kalaw to the west

Formerly, the northern half of Hopong Township was part of Mong Kung Township (Mongkaung Township).

== Demographics ==
=== 2014 ===
Historical Population
Year	Pop.	±%
1973		—
1983		—
2014	381,639	—
Source: Ministry of Labor, Immigration, and Population data

The 2014 Myanmar Census reported that Taunggyi Township had a population of 381,639. The population density was 350.1 people per km^{2}. The census reported that the median age was 26.2 years, and 95 males per 100 females. There were 82,604 households; the mean household size was 4.3.

== Education ==
The largest high school is Basic Education High School No. 4 Taunggyi.

== Towns ==
- Taunggyi
- Ayethaya
- Kyauktalonegyi
- Kunlon

== Communities ==
In addition to the town of Taunggyi itself, there are two large towns in Taunggyi Township: Ayetharyar and Kyauktalonegyi. Among the many villages and wards (village census tracts) in Taunggyi Township are:

- Chaunggauk
- Hang Si,
- Htedaung,
- Kanpaw Tang-tok,
- Kon-Kawng,
- Lothkan,
- Mai Tang Hsong,
- Man Kong,
- Nyawngkon,
- Sakangyi,
- Shwenyaung, and
- Wan Mansaw.
