= Lawksawk Township =

- Township
- Location in Taunggyi district
- Coordinates: 21°14′00″N 96°52′00″E
- Country: Myanmar
- State: Shan State
- District: Taunggyi District
- Elevation: 955 m (3,132 ft)
- Time zone: UTC+6.30 (MMT)

Lawksawk Township (Burmese: Yatsawk or Yatsauk) is a township of Taunggyi District in the Shan State of Myanmar. The principal town is Lawksawk.

== Geography ==
Lawksawk Township is bounded on the north by the townships of Nawnghkio, Kyaukme, and Hsipaw; on the east by Mong Kung and Hopong; on the south by Taunggyi, Kalaw, and Pingdaya; and on the west by Ywangan. It is the northernmost township in the Taunggyi District.

Lawksawk is situated in a mountainous region with ranges generally running north and south, divided by broad valleys. Most of the township is within the drainage basins of two rivers, the Zawgyi and the Nam Lang.

== History ==
=== Saohpas of Lawksawk ===
Lawksawk has traditionally been ruled by a saohpa (chieftain). The following is a list of the known saohpas of Lawksawk:

- Hkun Sam Lik 1791–1811
- On Gaing 1812–1813
- Hkun Shwe Ek 1813–1850
- Vacant 1850–1854
- Sao Weng (first time) 1854–1881
- Occupied by Yawnghwe 1881–1886
- Sao Weng (second time) 1886–1887
- Bo Saing (regent) 1887
- Hkun Nu 1887–1900
- Sao Hkun Nsok 1900–1946
- Sao Hkun Hsa 1946–1952
