= Hopin Academy =

Educational nonprofit in Ghana

HOPin Academy
- Company type: for-profit private company
- Genre: private educational organization in the developing world
- Founded: 2010
- Founders: MacCarthy M. Mac-Gbathy, Anders Midtgaard
- Area served: Ghana
- Website: www.hopinacademy.org

HOPin Academy is an ecosystem development organization located in Tamale, Northern Region, Ghana. The school specializes on training online marketing, social media communication, writing, video production, entrepreneurial work and web communications. Hopin Academy has an international academic partnership with Bryn Mawr College and Haverford College through the BiCo-Dalun Summer Action Research Fellowship, a learning program fostered in 2010 where Bryn Mawr and Haverford students create community projects with Ghanaian partners. According to the Hopin Academy website, it offers courses in writing, design, film, and entrepreneurial work. It also provides training to NGOs, government organizations, and other schools, including as the Olive School of Journalism.

== History ==
The educational initiative was founded by MacCarthy M. Mac-Gbathy and Anders Midtgaard

== Collaborations ==
HOPin Academy supports Barcamp Tamale, which is a networking forum hosted in Tamale that connects Ghanaian leaders and innovators with young people. HOPin Academy also supports the Youth Speak Up Project, a Ghanaian advocacy program that aims to empower youth through technology education. HOPin Academy has collaborated with other educational institutions in the international community, including:

- Young Engineers / Future Leaders
- Salvation Army
- unicef
- mest
- Olive School of Journalism
- Tamale Polytechnic
- University for Development Studies
- Bryn Mawr College
- Haverford College
- Viborg Gymnasium
- Ghana Friendship Groups

* YEfL-Ghana

- Copenhagen Business Academy
- NORSAAC
