= Hsi Hseng =

Hsi Hseng ဆီဆိုင်မြို့, ဝေင်ꩻသီႏသဲင်ႏ
- Town
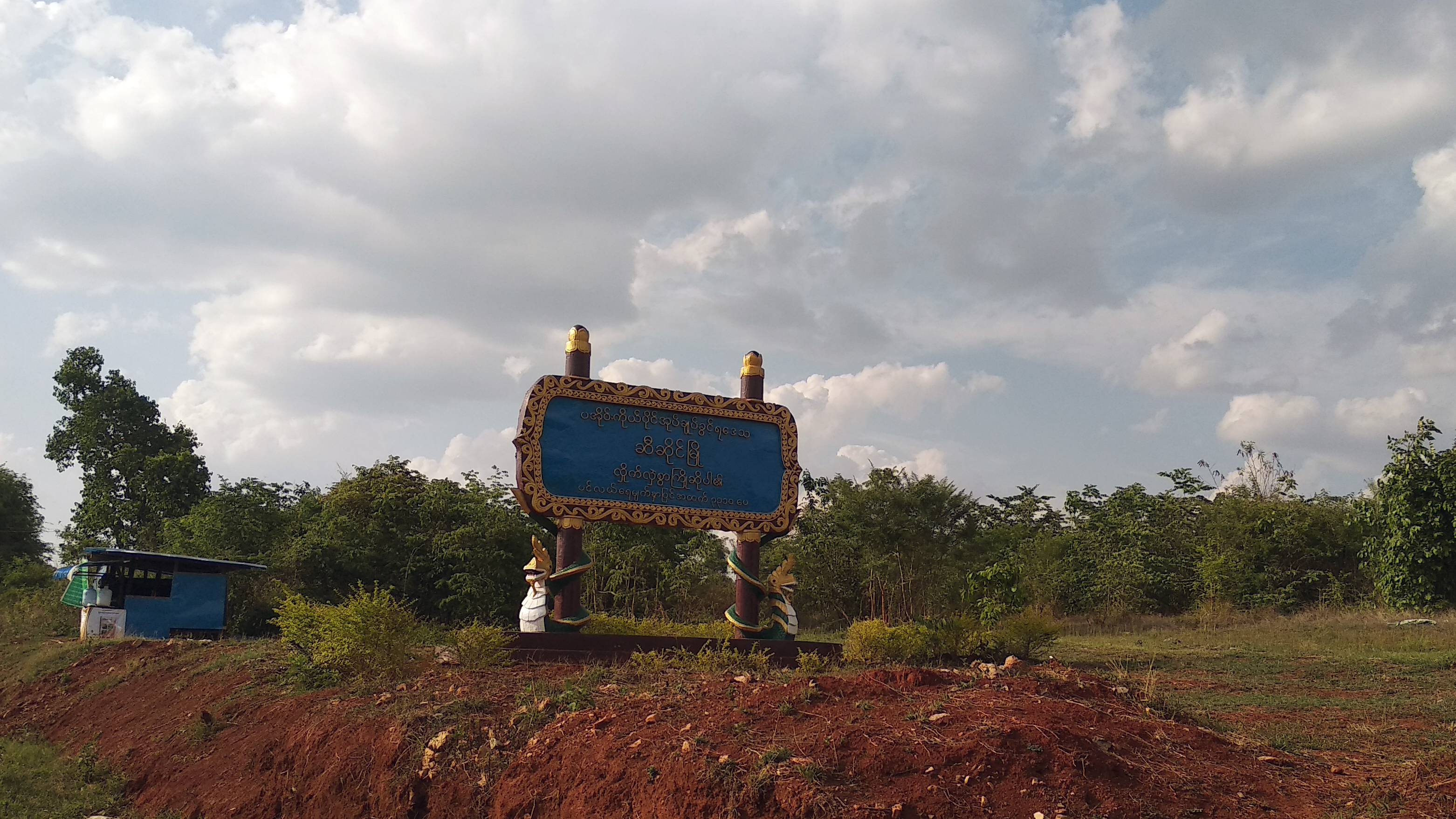

- Location in Myanmar
- Coordinates: 20°9′N 97°15′E
- Country: Myanmar
- State: Shan State
- Zone: Pa-O Self-Administered Zone
- Township: Hsi Hseng Township
- Control: / Joint Pa-O National Liberation Army and Karenni Nationalities Defence Force control
- Time zone: UTC+6.30 (MMT)

Hsi Hseng or Hsi-hseng (Burmese: ဆီဆိုင်မြို့) (Pa'o Karen: ဝေင်ꩻသီႏသဲင်ႏ(ဝေင်ꩻသထွုံႏပေႏ)) is a town in the Shan State of eastern Burma. It is located in Hsi Hseng Township in the Pa-O Self-Administered Zone and lies along National Highway 5. It is connected to Loikaw in the South and Taunggyi in the south. The area is a known producer of opium and methamphetamine; poppy fields and a methamphetamine factory have been reported in Hsi Hseng. Gee Dong was killed near Hsi Hseng in 1974. People there are mostly Pa-Oh and some are Shan but Burmese are increasing now on 2023.

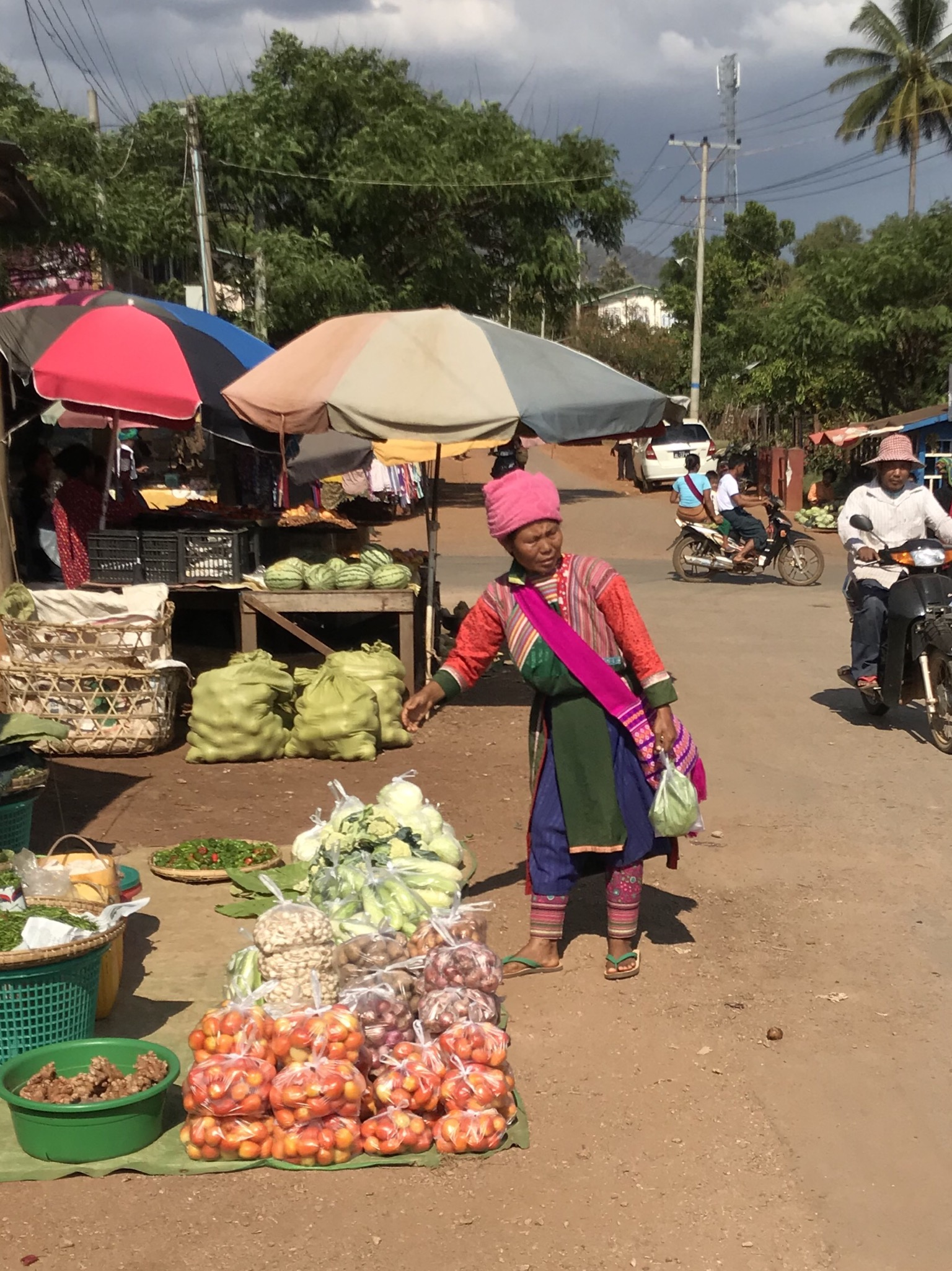
A Lisu woman at a market in Hsi Hseng, Southern Shan State

Although sources differ, Hsi Hseng is also considered to be the town where Pa'O musician Khun Thar Doon was murdered in 1978 by Pa'O communists.

In January 2024, the town came under attack by a joint force of the Pa-O National Liberation Organization and the Karenni Nationalities Defense Force.
