= Taunggyi =

Capital of Shan State, Myanmar

Taunggyi တောင်ကြီး (Burmese) ဝေင်ꩻတောင်ႏကီꩻ(Pa'O) ဝဵင်းတူၼ်ႈတီး (Shan)
- Capital Town
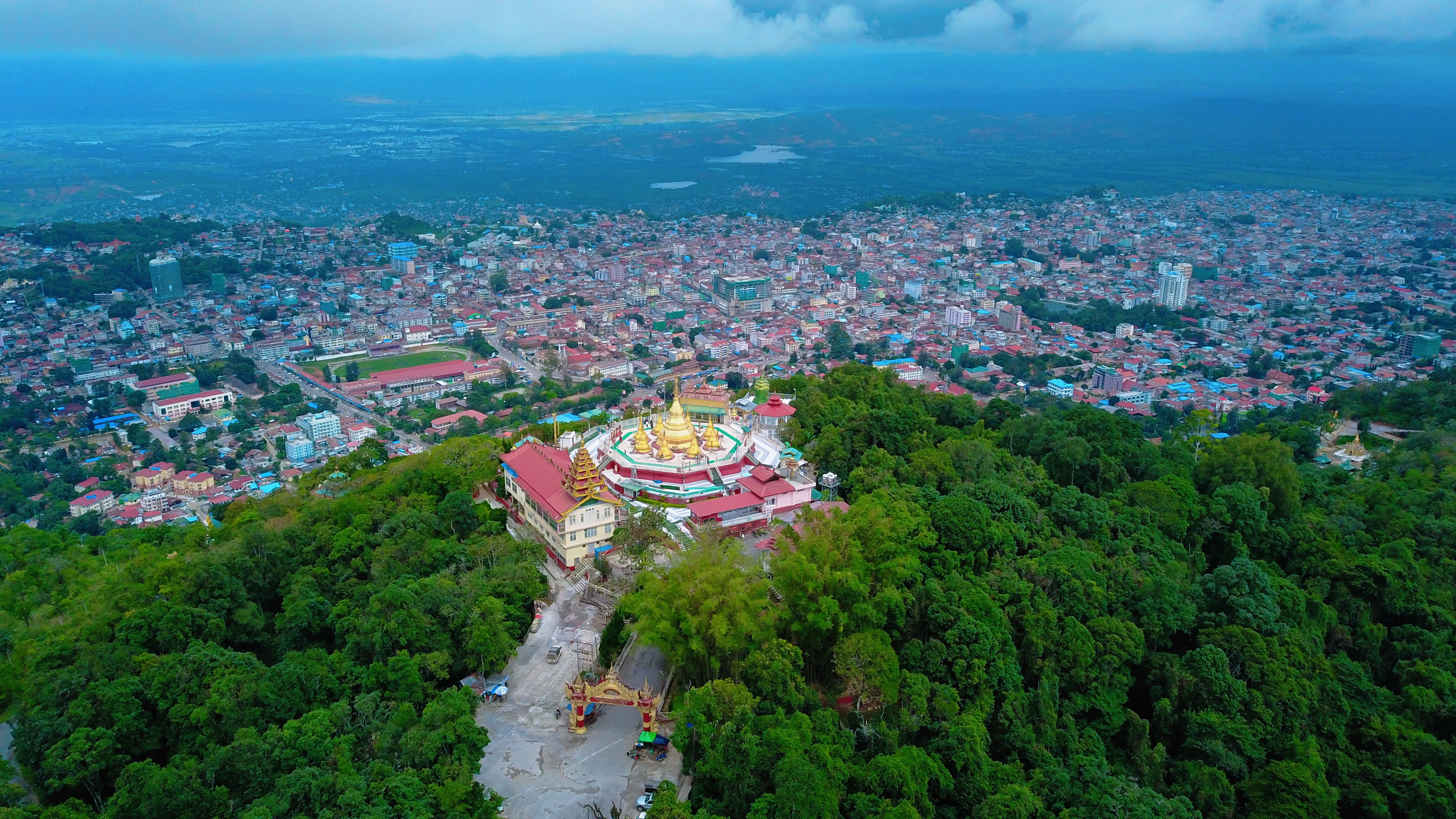
- A view of Taunggyi

- Location of Taunggyi, Myanmar
- Coordinates: 20°47′N 97°02′E
- Country: Myanmar
- State: Shan State
- District: Taunggyi District
- Township: Taunggyi Township
- Founded: 1894

Government
  - Mayor: U Khun Tun Phyu (USDP)
- Elevation: 4,711 ft (1,436 m)

Population (2014 Census)
  - Capital Town: 381,639
  - Urban: 264,804
  - Rural: 116,835
  - Ethnicities: Pa-O Shan Burmese Burmese Chinese Burmese Indians Gurkha
  - Religions: Buddhism Islam Christianity
- Time zone: UTC+6.30 (MST)

Taunggyi is the capital and largest city of Shan State, Myanmar. It also serves as the administrative seat of Southern Shan State. Situated on the eastern mountains of Myanmar at an elevation of 4,712 feet (1,436 meters) above sea level, it is a city known for its pleasant and cool climate. Unlike many other cities, Taunggyi is built directly along the mountain ridges rather than on the valley floor.

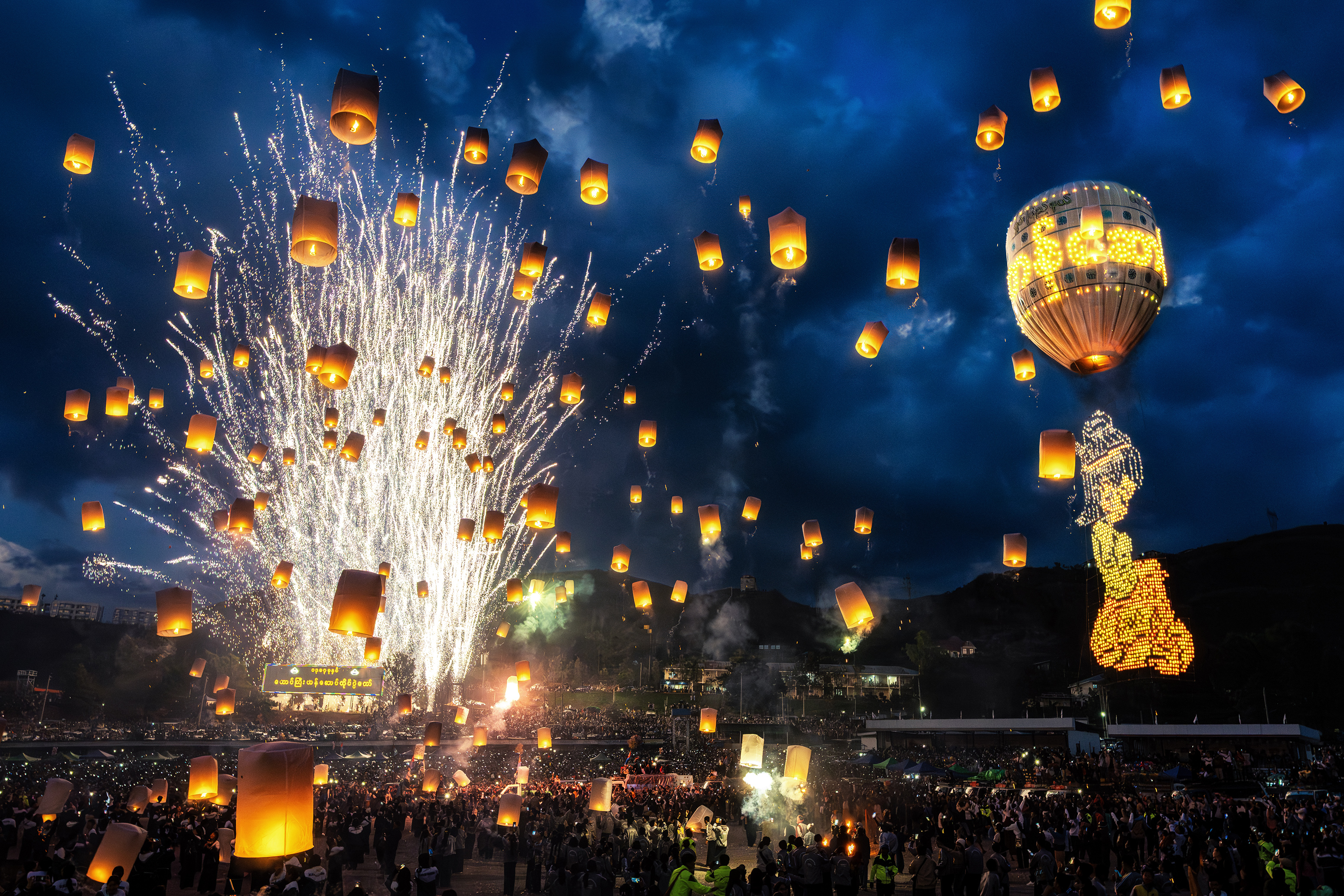
Opening night of the Taunggyi Tazaungdaing Festival (2025)

Due to its high-altitude location, the beauty of the surrounding valleys and mountain ranges can be viewed from almost any part of the city. Taunggyi is renowned as a healthy hill station where residents and visitors can enjoy fresh, clean mountain air year-round.

In addition to being a scenic hill station, Taunggyi is the administrative, economic, and educational heart of Shan State. Strategically located on major highways connecting Southern, Northern, and Eastern Shan State (Kengtung), it serves as a vital hub for the flow of goods. As the state capital, it is the busiest urban center in Shan State, home to modern infrastructure, several universities, and major healthcare facilities. The city’s beauty is further enhanced by the blooming of cherry blossoms in late autumn and winter, followed by the vibrant purple Jacaranda and orchid tree flowers in the spring.

== Etymology ==
The name Taunggyi (Burmese: တောင်ကြီးမြို့) means "big mountain" in Burmese, referencing a ridge on the east of the city, part of the Shan Hills system, whose prominent high point is called Taung-chun or "The Spur." Locally this spur is also known as Mingalar Taung-chun, meaning “The Auspicious Spur.” The ridge has a more prominent and more popular feature known as Chauk Talone, meaning the Craigs.

Taunggyi is also known as Tonti (ဝဵင်းတူၼ်ႈတီး, Shan pronunciation: [weŋ˥ ton˧˧˨ ti˥]) in Shan and ဝေင်ꩻတောင်ႏကီꩻ (Pa'O pronunciation: [weŋ˨ tɔːŋ˧ kiː˨]) in Pa'O.

== History ==
Before Taunggyi was established, there were Mon Chè, Hum Bwa, Oo See, Twan Tee and Kho Che villages at the surrounding areas of that place. These villages were under the administration of Nyaungshwe Sawbwas.

=== British Colonial Period ===
The modern development of Taunggyi began following the British annexation of Upper Burma in 1885. Initially, the British colonial administration established its administrative headquarters for the Shan States at Maing Thauk (Fort Stedman) on the eastern shore of Inle Lake. However, the location proved unsuitable due to the prevalence of malaria and the damp, low-lying geography. In 1894, the British government decided to relocate the administrative offices to the higher, healthier elevation of the plateau where the village of Taunggyi stood. The town was systematically planned as a hill station with a grid-like street pattern. By 1906, Taunggyi had grown into a strategic military and civil supply base, housing approximately 1,000 buildings and serving as the primary residence for the British Superintendent of the Southern Shan States.

=== Post-Independence and Growth ===
Following Myanmar's independence in 1948, Taunggyi remained the capital of Shan State. Its growth accelerated due to its strategic position on the road to Kengtung and the Thai border, making it a critical junction for trade and military logistics. In recent decades, the city has evolved from a quiet administrative post into a bustling commercial and educational center. The city became a significant destination for internal migration, leading to a diverse population of Pa-O, Shan, Intha, and Burmese-Chinese communities. Today, it is recognized as the fifth-largest city in Myanmar and continues to serve as the gateway to the southern Shan region.

== Geography ==
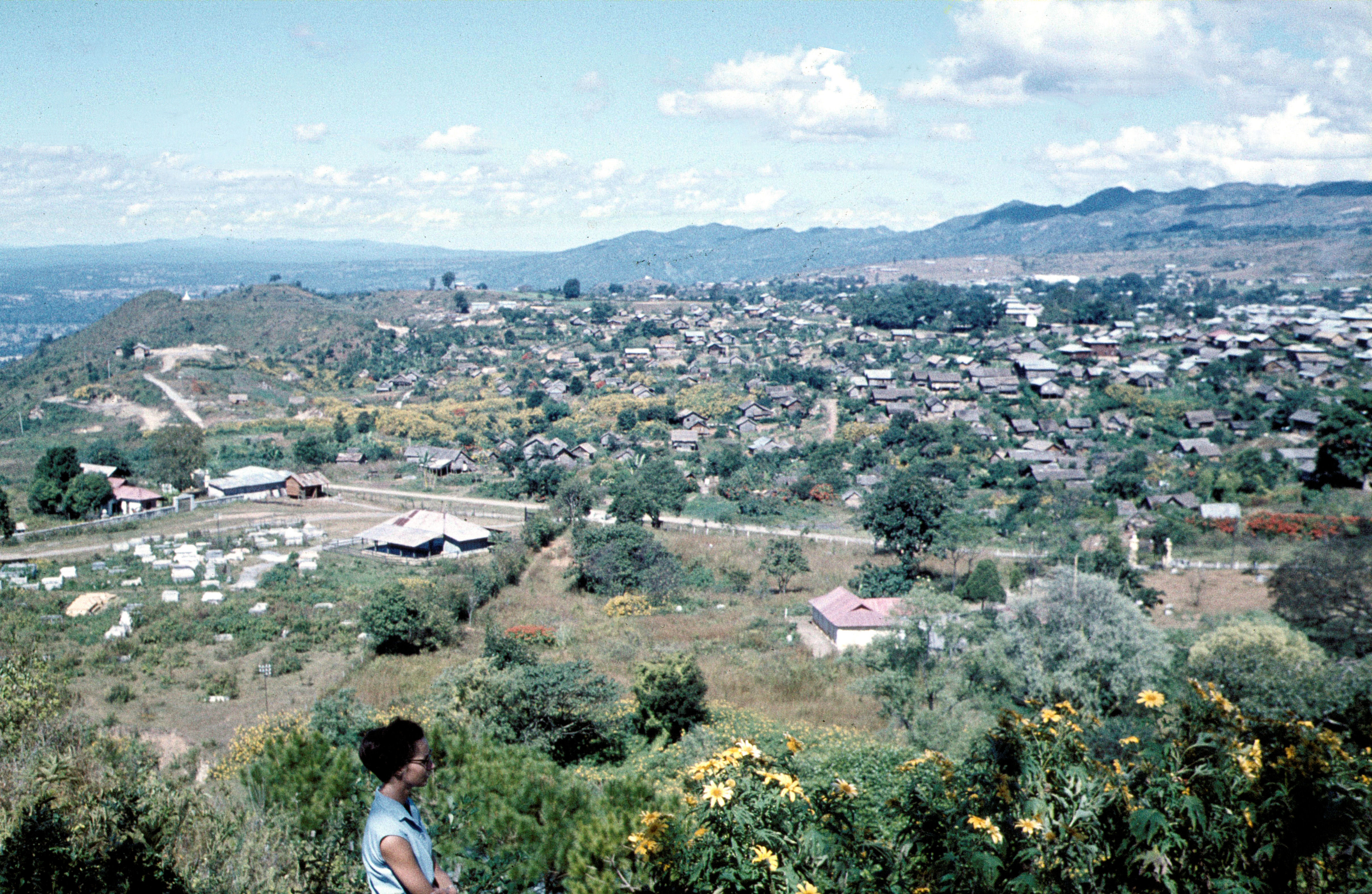
Taunggyi city in 1961

Taunggyi is at an elevation of 4,712 feet (1,436 m) above sea level. It sits on a high intermontaine basin (erroneously called a plateau) that rapidly descends to the western lowland river valleys that make up central Myanmar, but is otherwise surrounded by mountain range. The city is 635 kilometres (395 mi) from Yangon (Rangoun) by road.

=== Climate ===
Taunggyi has a humid subtropical climate (Köppen climate classification Cwa), closely bordering a subtropical highland climate (Cwb). There is a winter dry season (December–March) and a summer wet-season (April–November). Temperatures are very warm throughout the year; the winter months (December–February) are milder and the nights can be quite cool.

Climate data for Taunggyi (1991–2020)
Month	Jan	Feb	Mar	Apr	May	Jun	Jul	Aug	Sep	Oct	Nov	Dec	Year
Record high °C (°F)	28.4 (83.1)	33.0 (91.4)	33.0 (91.4)	34.3 (93.7)	34.6 (94.3)	34.0 (93.2)	31.0 (87.8)	30.2 (86.4)	28.7 (83.7)	30.2 (86.4)	30.0 (86.0)	29.7 (85.5)	34.6 (94.3)
Mean daily maximum °C (°F)	23.6 (74.5)	25.7 (78.3)	28.4 (83.1)	29.5 (85.1)	27.2 (81.0)	25.3 (77.5)	24.3 (75.7)	24.1 (75.4)	24.9 (76.8)	25.1 (77.2)	24.5 (76.1)	23.2 (73.8)	25.5 (77.9)
Daily mean °C (°F)	16.2 (61.2)	17.9 (64.2)	21.0 (69.8)	23.0 (73.4)	22.5 (72.5)	21.7 (71.1)	21.2 (70.2)	21.1 (70.0)	21.3 (70.3)	20.7 (69.3)	18.8 (65.8)	16.5 (61.7)	20.1 (68.2)
Mean daily minimum °C (°F)	8.7 (47.7)	10.2 (50.4)	13.6 (56.5)	16.5 (61.7)	17.7 (63.9)	18.2 (64.8)	18.1 (64.6)	18.0 (64.4)	17.7 (63.9)	16.3 (61.3)	13.1 (55.6)	9.9 (49.8)	14.8 (58.6)
Record low °C (°F)	3.9 (39.0)	5.0 (41.0)	8.5 (47.3)	11.5 (52.7)	12.7 (54.9)	13.2 (55.8)	16.4 (61.5)	16.2 (61.2)	15.0 (59.0)	10.0 (50.0)	6.0 (42.8)	3.0 (37.4)	3.0 (37.4)
Average precipitation mm (inches)	11.5 (0.45)	4.4 (0.17)	9.3 (0.37)	51.4 (2.02)	172.2 (6.78)	170.6 (6.72)	217.4 (8.56)	300.8 (11.84)	258.0 (10.16)	182.2 (7.17)	54.2 (2.13)	12.7 (0.50)	1,444.8 (56.88)
Average precipitation days (≥ 1.0 mm)	1.0	0.5	1.5	6.1	15.0	19.3	22.4	24.5	20.5	14.6	5.2	1.6	132.3
Average relative humidity (%)	57	47	43	49	72	81	83	85	84	81	71	64	68
Source 1: World Meteorological Organization
Source 2: Norwegian Meteorological Institute (extremes), Climate Data (humidity), NOAA (extremes)

== Demographics ==
Taunggyi is ethnically diverse, with inhabitants from the Pa'O, Bamar, and Shan ethnicities. The 2014 Myanmar Census reported that Taunggyi Township had a population of 381,639.

== Transportation ==
The primary mode of access to Taunggyi is by road. The mountain passes that climb from the plains below are steep and winding.

=== Road ===
Taunggyi is a major junction on the National Highway 4, which connects the city to Meiktila and the central plains to the west, and to Kengtung and the Thai border at Tachileik to the east. The city is also connected to northern Shan State via the Taunggyi–Lashio highway.

=== Rail ===
While a railway line passing through Taunggyi was completed in 1995, it has historically faced technical challenges due to the steep terrain. As of 2026, passenger services to Taunggyi remain limited or specialized. The primary rail hub for the region is located in Shwenyaung, situated 12 miles (19 km) to the west. Shwenyaung serves as the terminus for the scenic railway line from Thazi Junction, providing a vital link for both goods and passengers to the national rail network.

=== Air ===
The city is served by Heho Airport (HEH), located approximately 24 miles (39 km) or about a one-hour drive to the west. Heho is a major regional airport with frequent scheduled flights to Yangon, Mandalay, and Bagan, and serves as the gateway for tourists visiting both Taunggyi and Inle Lake.

=== Internal Transport ===
Within the city, transportation is dominated by local "thoun bein" (three-wheeled taxis), motorcycles, and a network of small passenger buses (locally referred to as "hilux") that connect different wards and the suburban areas like Ayetharyar.

== Culture ==
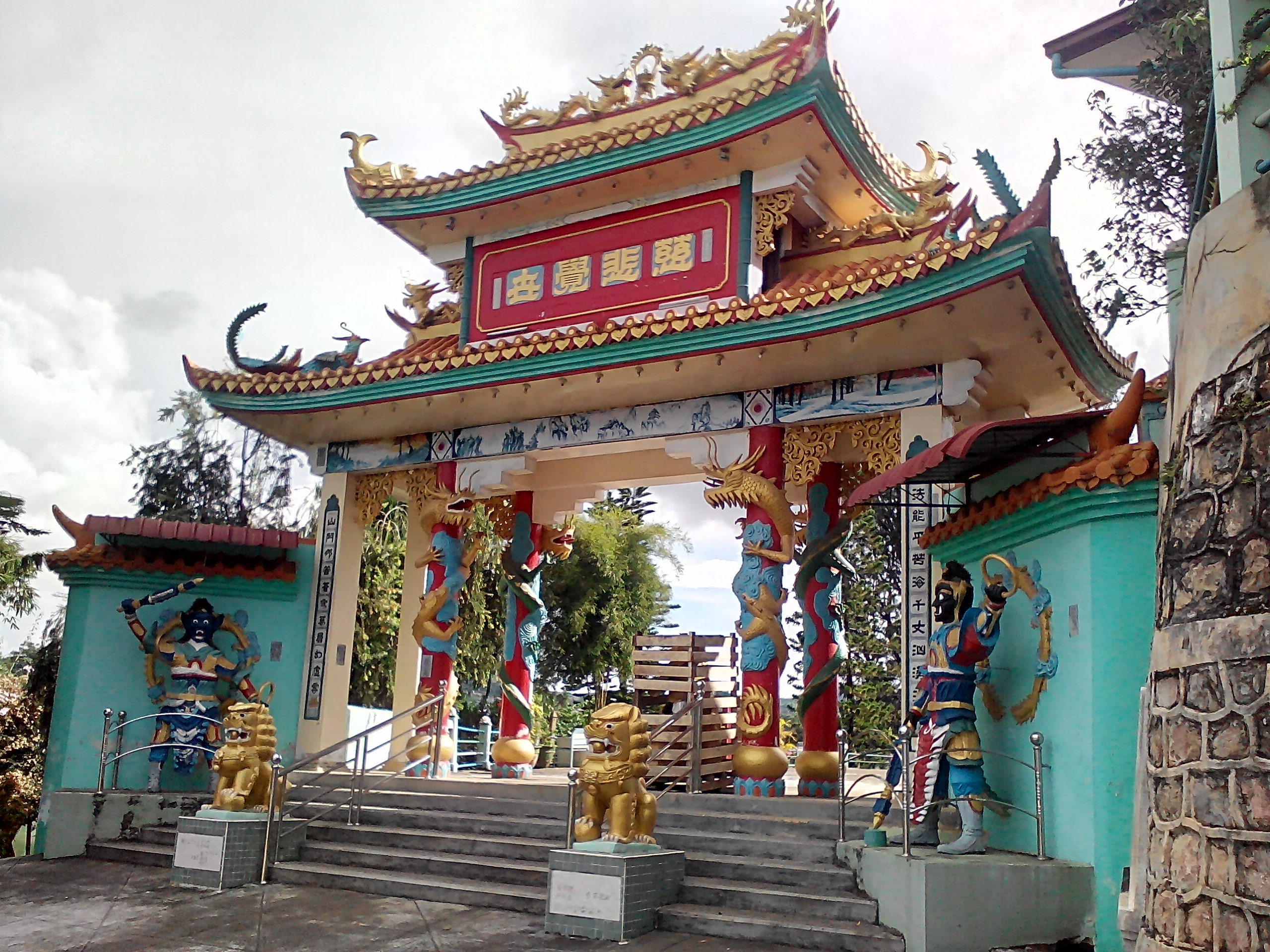
The Guan Yin Buddhist Monastery (Kwan Yin Si Hpaya Kyaung) in Taunggyi serves the local Chinese community.

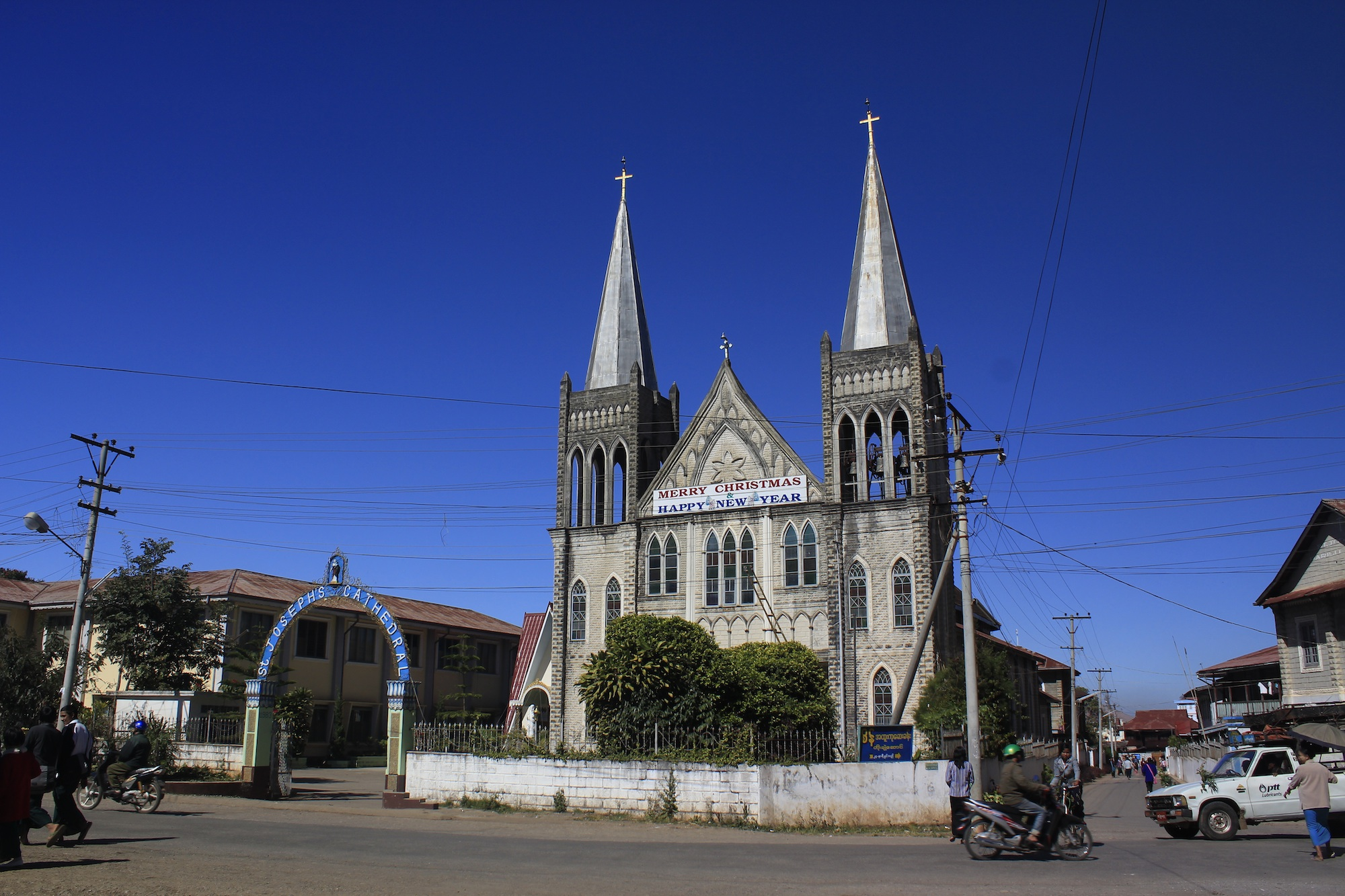
St. Joseph's Cathedral in Taunggyi serves as the headquarters of the Archdiocese of Taunggyi.

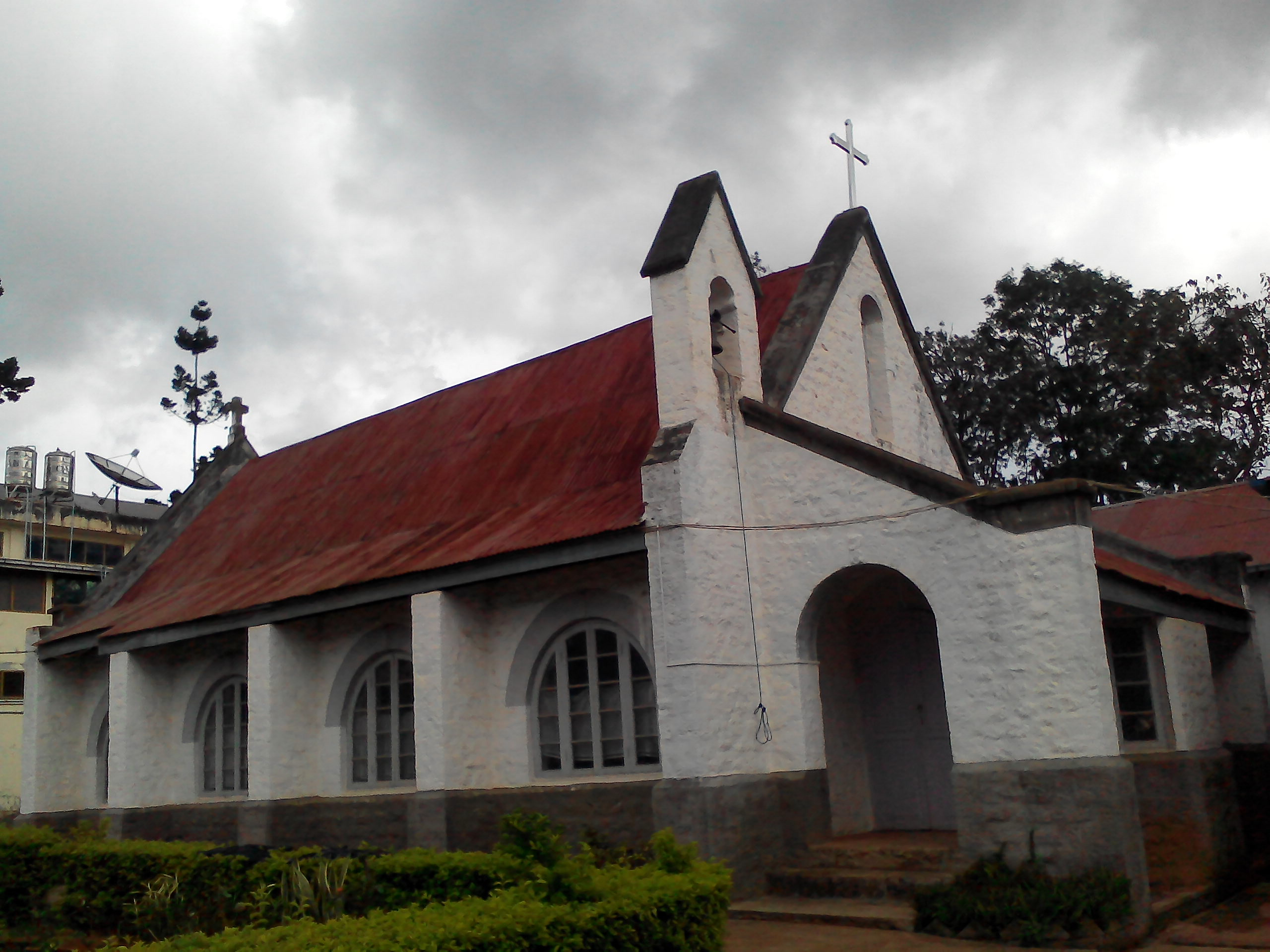
St.George Anglican Church

Taunggyi is the melting pot for the Myelat area of the Shan State. As with most of Myanmar, the influence of Buddhism is demonstrated by the monasteries scattered throughout the city. However, being a relatively new city, the monasteries are not of historical significance and architecturally not unique. There is also a significant Christian population, as the centre of the Roman Catholic Archdiocese of Taunggyi the St. Joseph's Cathedral and its associated seminary are the main facilities, as well as a Baptist church. Both churches were established by early missionaries. There is also a smaller Anglican church, which originally served the British administrators, but recently it has fallen into a state of disrepair. Four mosques serve the Muslim communities of the city, of which Panthay mosque serves the Chinese Panthay Muslims mainly. There are also a few temples serving the Chinese Buddhist community.

The Taunggyi celebration of the Tazaungdaing Festival, a national holiday marking the end of the rainy season, has achieved international attention for pyrotechnic rockets involved in the Taunggyi Hot Air Balloon Festival. There were 9 people injured in 2018, 2 deaths and 12 injuries in 2017, and 4 deaths in 2014.

The city also hosts Eastern Command of the Tatmadaw (Myanmar military) and it occupies a significant portion of the north-east area of the city. The Shan State Cultural Museum lies in Taunggyi. The museum displays the Shan culture, as well as items of historical interest, such as the belongings of Sawbwa.

== Economy ==
=== Tourism ===
The Taunggyi area is a popular tourist destination. The city itself has an interesting five-day market, where farmers from around the area come to the Taunggyi on market day and sell fresh produce in the open market, but with more development of the city, the significance of market day has been lessened. However, the market-day tradition continues strong in the outlying small towns. Nearby, Inle Lake နောင်အင်းလေး is the home of the unique Intha culture. Inlay is famous for its traditional crafts industry and floating markets that are accessible via traditional longboats. The most unique thing is that Intha row the boat with their leg. On the way to the Pindaya Caves provides visitors with a good view of the Myelat countryside. The Kekku Pagodasblk:မွေႏတောႏကက္ကူႏ, which feature hundreds of stupas dating to the 16th century, are near Taunggyi.

=== Industry ===
There is no significant industry in Taunggyi. It was once the trans-shipment point for many of the agricultural products of southern Shan State. However, due to recently imposed zoning regulations, most of these operations have been moved to the surrounding new town of Ayetharyar.

=== Agriculture ===
Another economy of Taunggyi is farming and gardening. Farmers around Taunggyi are mostly Shan ethnic origin. The main agricultural products of Taunggyi are potatoes, tea leaf, tomato, beans, damson and seasonal fruits.

== Education ==
The city is home to:

- Taunggyi University
- University of Computer Studies, Taunggyi
- University of Medicine, Taunggyi
- Technological University, Taunggyi
- Taunggyi Education College

== Sports ==
The 7,000-seat Taunggyi Stadium is a multi-use stadium in Taunggyi. The stadium is the home ground of Shan United FC, a Myanmar National League (MNL) football club.

== Health care ==
=== Public Hospitals ===
- Sao San Tun General Hospital
- Taunggyi Women and Children Hospital
- Taunggyi University Hospital
- Mettashin Charity Hospital-Eye Care Services

== Gallery ==
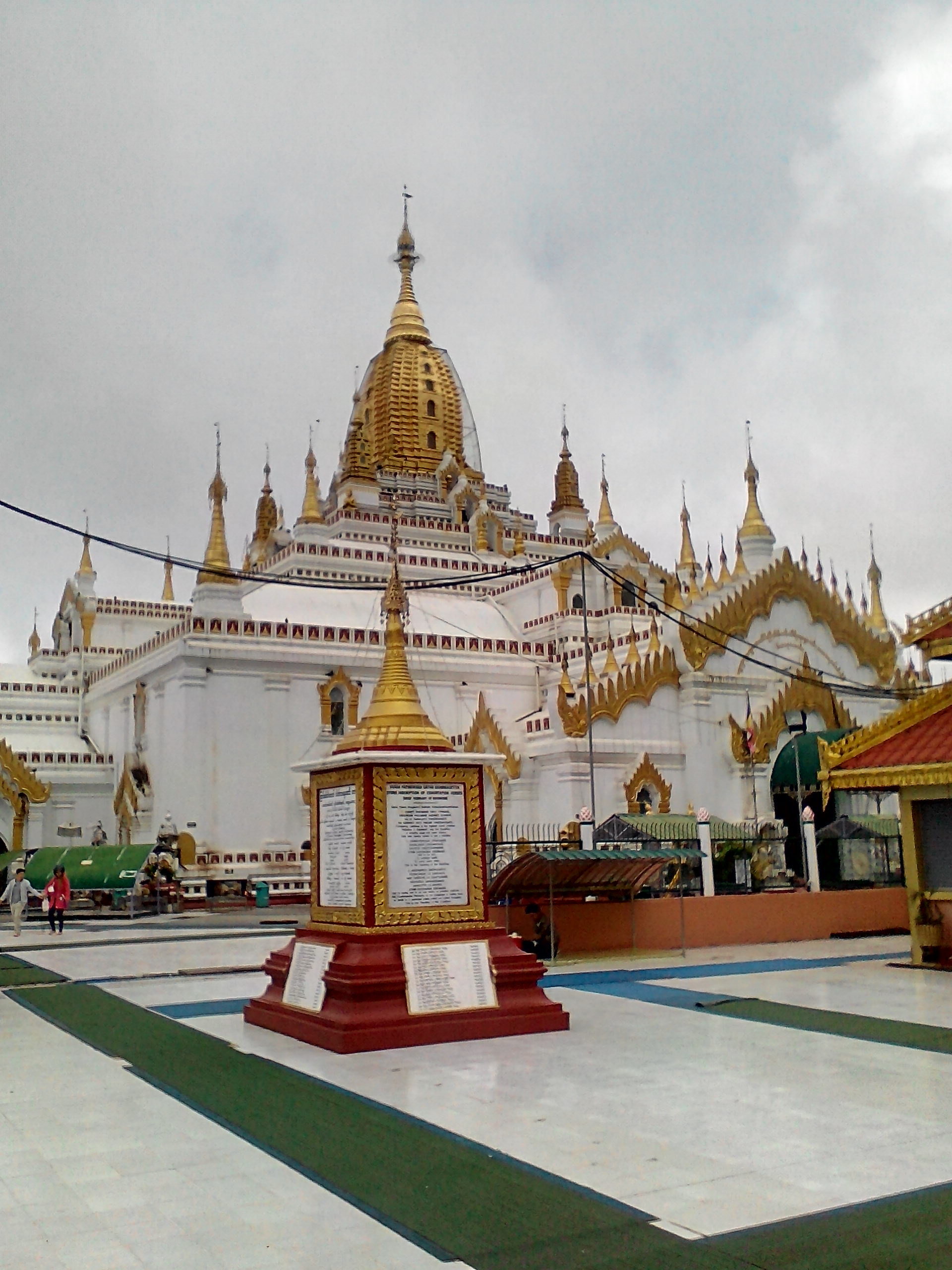
Taunggyi Sulamuni Pagoda

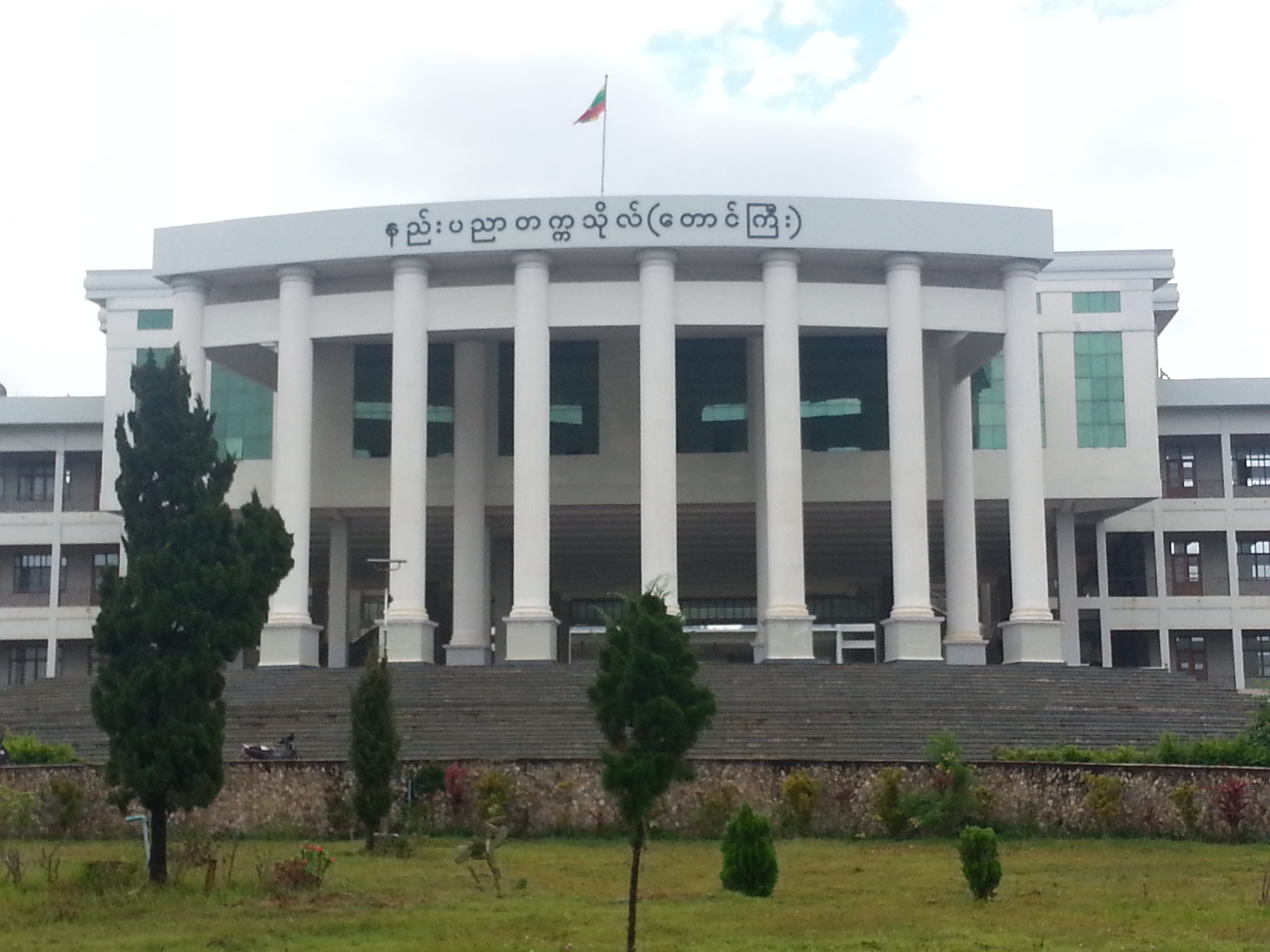
Technological University Taunggyi

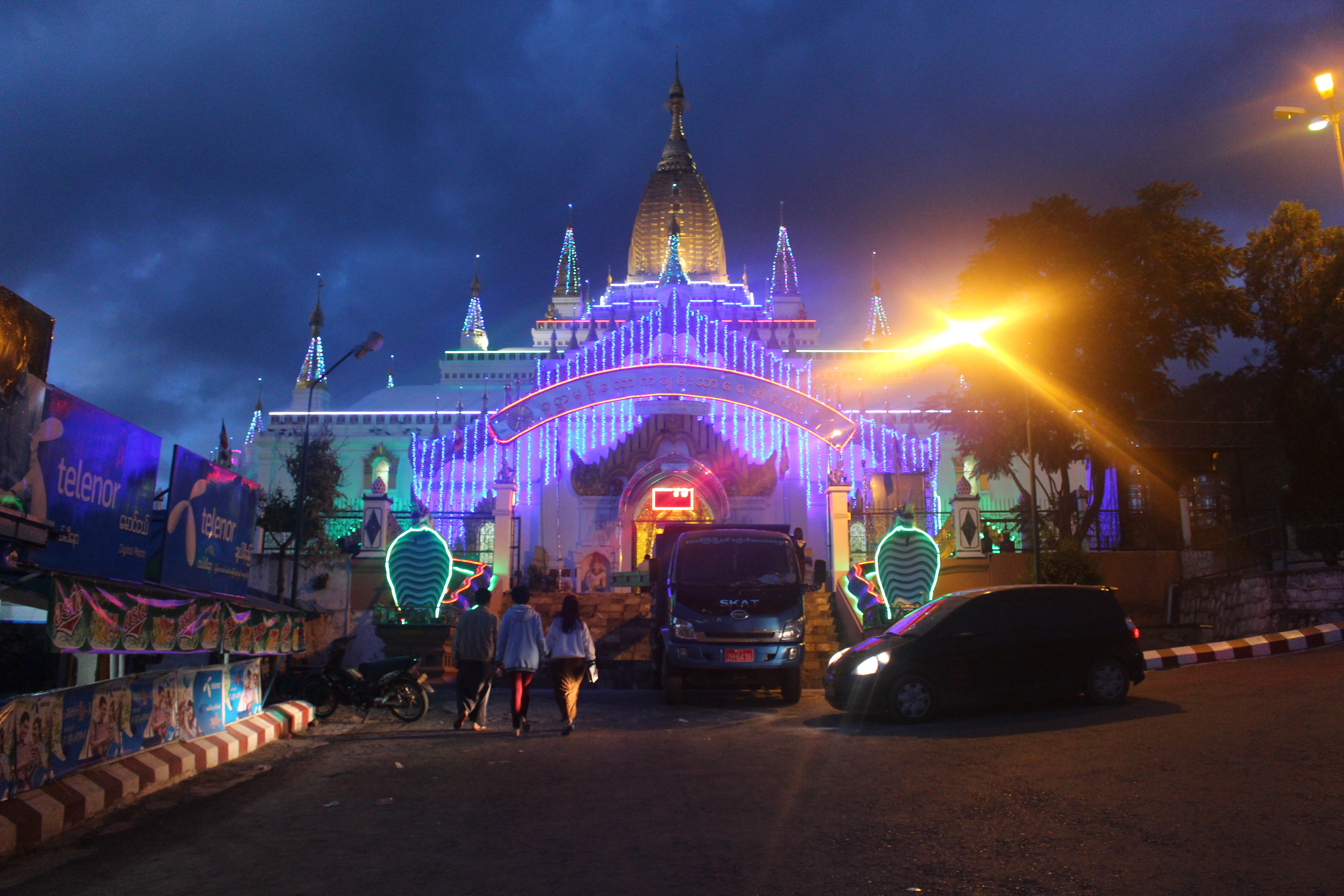
Sulamani Pagoda at night

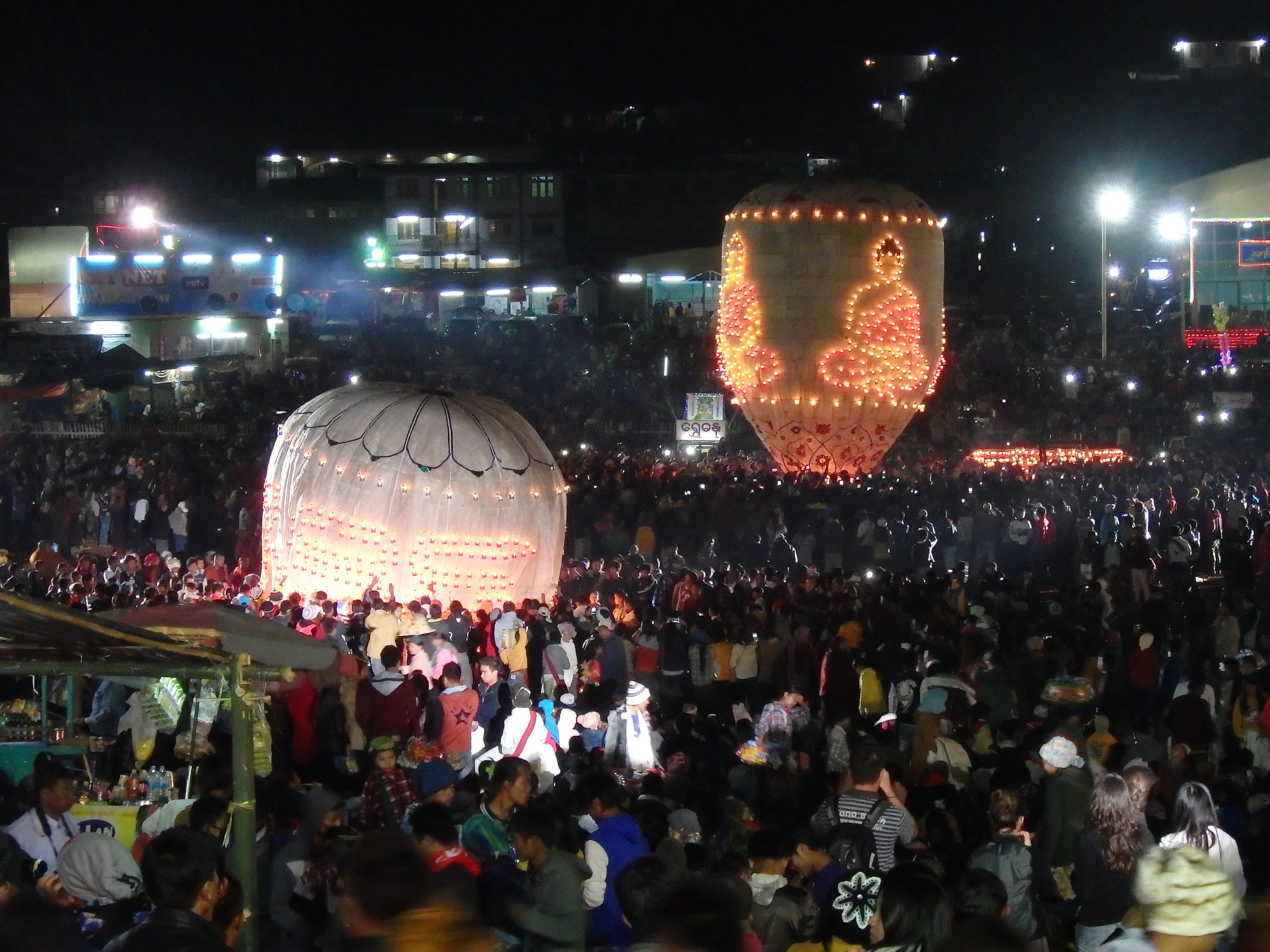
Hot air balloon Festival

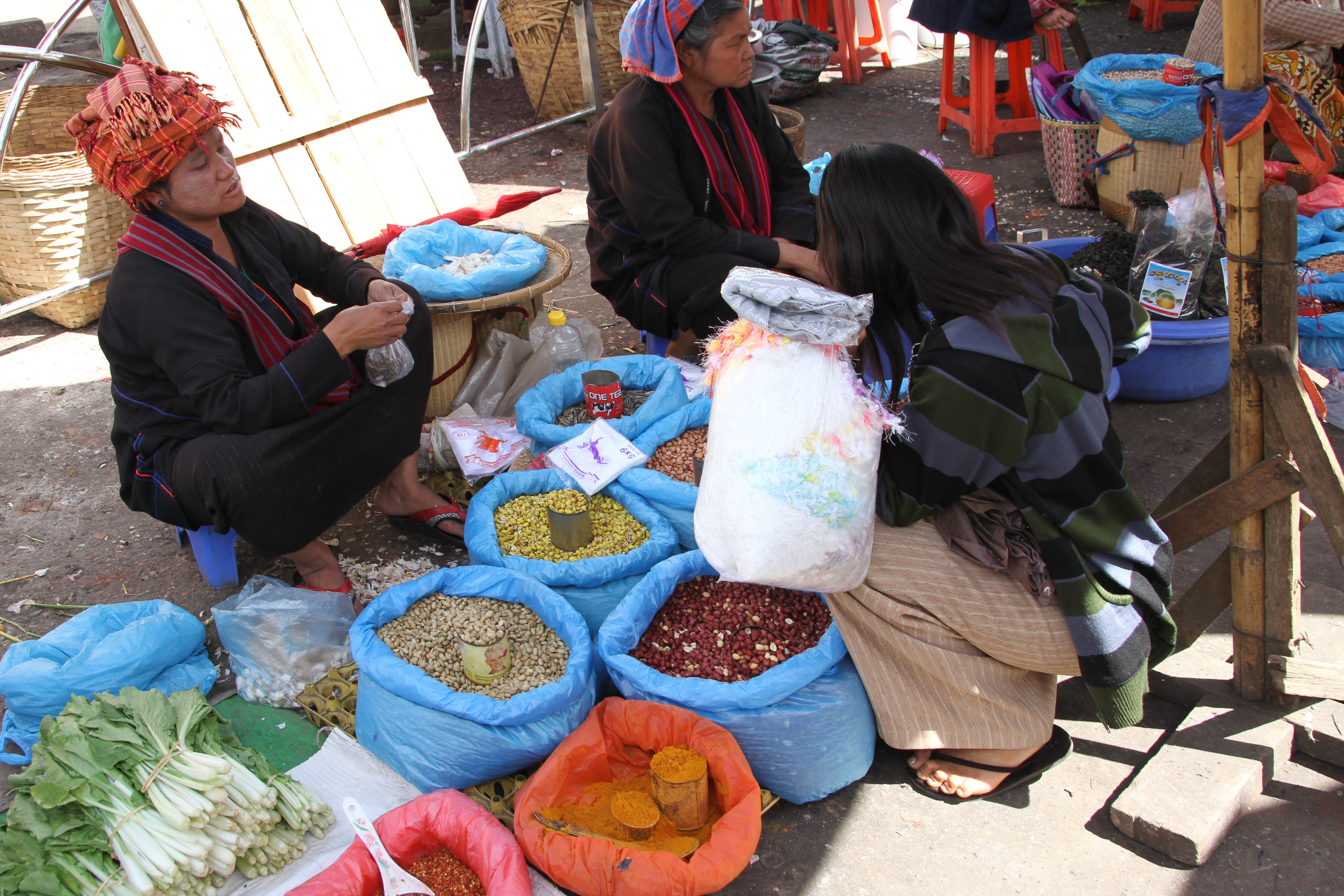
Myoma Market

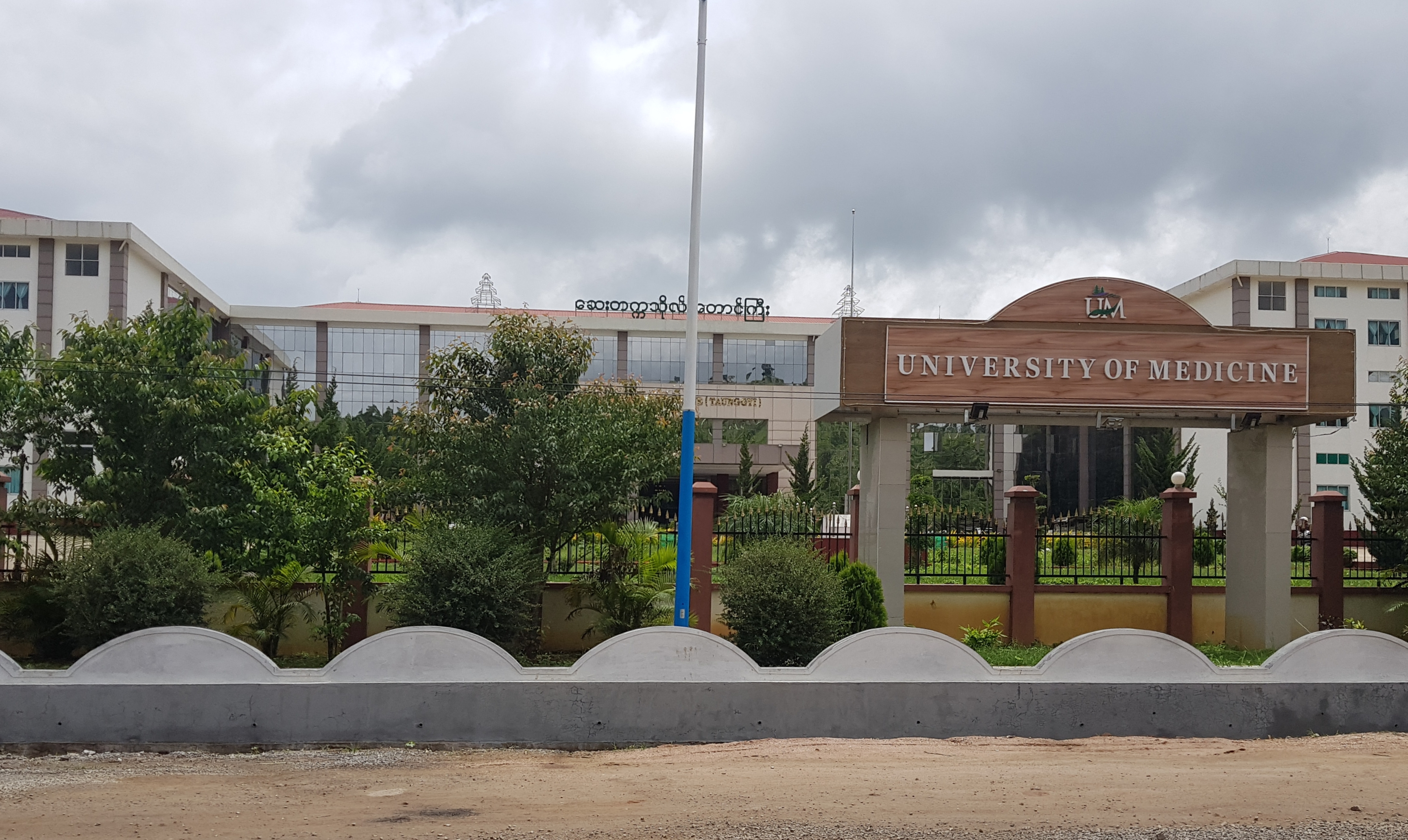
University of Medicine (Taunggyi)

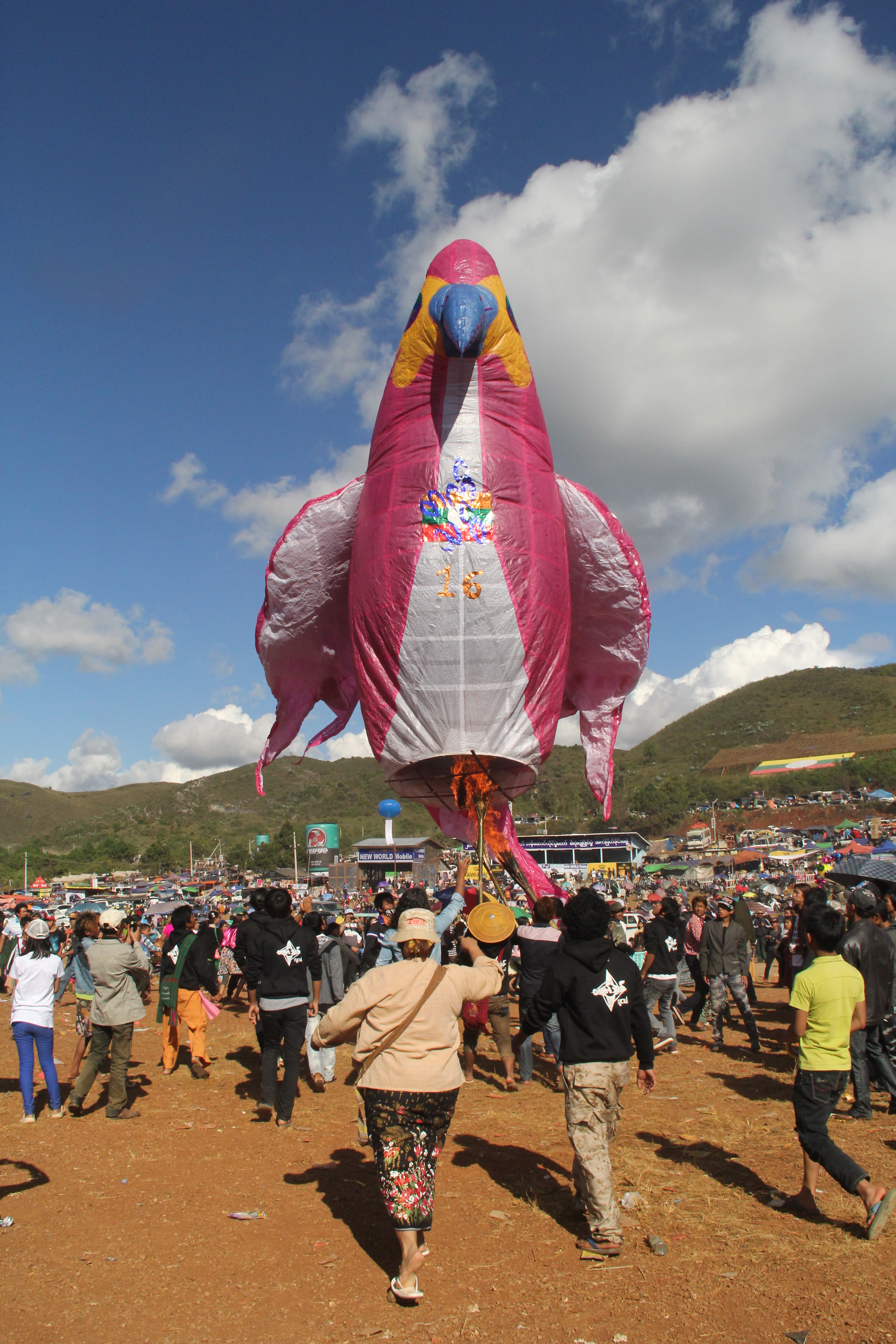
A festival in Taunggyi
