= National Highway 5 (Myanmar) =

Road in Myanmar

National Highway 5 (NH5) is a highway in southern-central Myanmar (formerly Burma). It connects Taungoo to Hopong, east of Taunggyi.

The highway is fed by National Highway 1 at Taungoo at 18°56′31″N 96°26′36″E. It initially goes in the northeast-east direction and then southeast until just south of the town of Hpasawng when the highway forks to the north at 18°49′37″N 97°18′53″E. The highway then continues in a northerly direction and eventually joins the west–east flowing National Highway 4 at Hopong at 20°48′2″N 97°10′25″E.
