= Hsi Hseng Township =

Hsi Hseng ဆီဆိုင်မြို့နယ်
- Township
- Location in the Pa-O Self Administered Zone
- Coordinates: 20°9′0″N 97°15′0″E
- Country: Myanmar
- State: Shan State
- District: Pa-O Self-Administered Zone
- Capital: Hsi Hseng

Area
  - Total: 790.95 sq mi (2,048.6 km^{2})
- Elevation: 3,080 ft (940 m)

Population (2023)
  - Total: 157,257
  - Density: 198.82/sq mi (76.765/km^{2})
- Time zone: UTC+6:30 (MMT)

Hsi Hseng Township (Burmese: ဆီဆိုင်မြို့နယ်, also spelt Hsihseng) is a township of the Pa-O Self-Administered Zone in southern Shan State of Myanmar. The principal town is Hsi Hseng.
