= Taunggyi District =

Taunggyi District တောင်ကြီးခရိုင်
- District
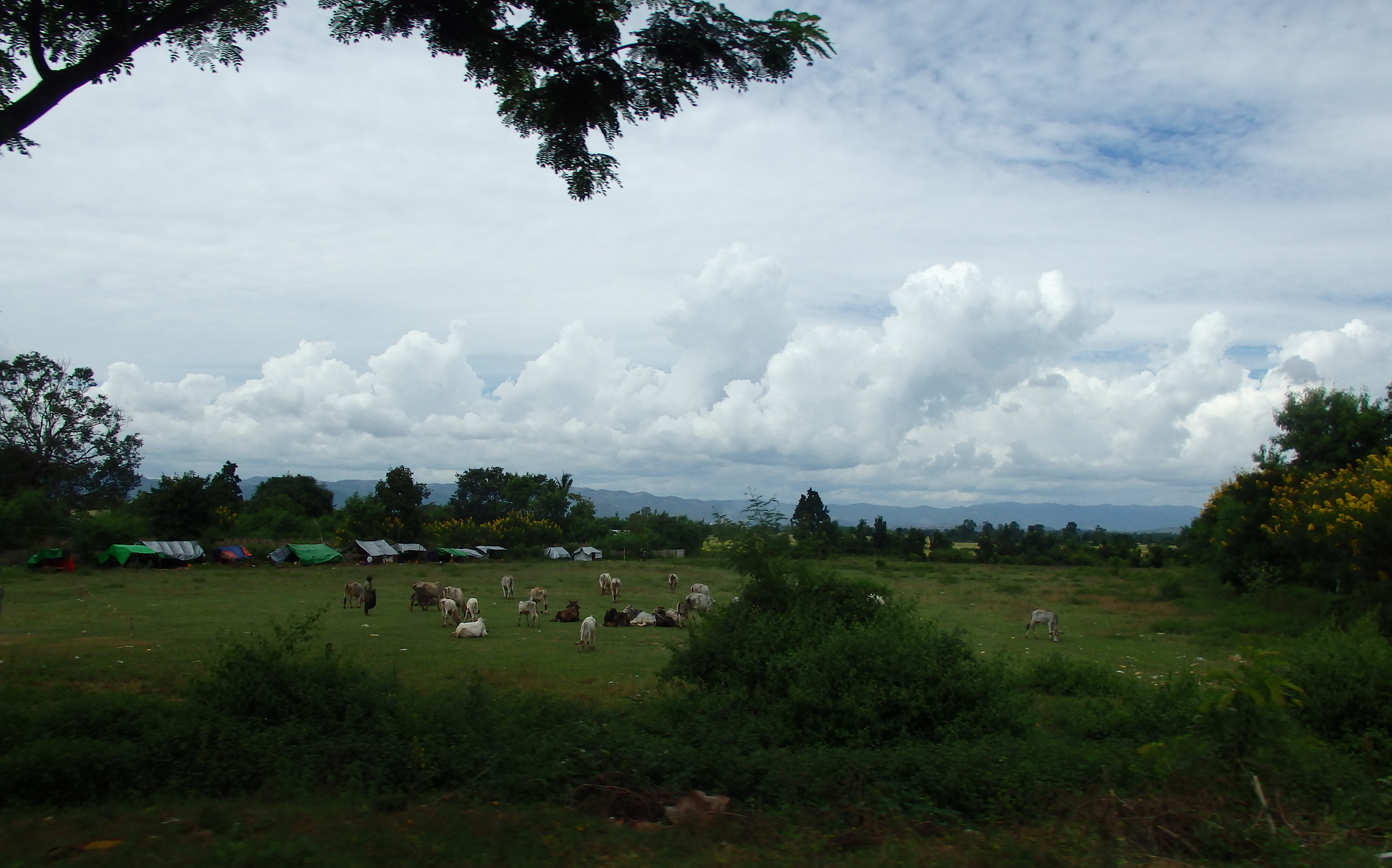
- Ayetharyar, Taunggyi District

- Taunggyi District in Shan State
- Coordinates: 20°40′N 97°00′E
- Country: Myanmar
- State: Shan State
- Capital: Taunggyi
- Elevation: 1,404 m (4,606 ft)
- Time zone: UTC+6.30 (MMT)

Taunggyi District (Burmese: တောင်ကြီးခရိုင်) is a district in South Shan State in eastern Myanmar. The principal town and administrative center is Taunggyi. The district has 2 townships.

== Administrative divisions ==
The District is made up of two townships - Taunggyi Township and Lawksawk Township.

In 2022, the District was split to form the new Kalaw District. Three townships - Kalaw Township, Nyaungshwe Township and Pekon Township - were split off from Taunggyi District, leaving the district with only two townships. In 2008, the country's new constitution defined two self-administered zones (SAZs), taking 7 townships out of the district to form the Danu Self-Administered Zone and the Pa-O Self Administered Zone.

Prior to 2008, the district contained the following townships:

Self-Administered Zones in Taunggyi district (pre-2008) Pa'O SAZ Danu SAZ

- Kalaw Township (now part of the Kalaw District)
- Lawksawk Township
- Nyaungshwe Township (now part of the Kalaw District)
- Pekon Township (now part of the Kalaw District)
- Taunggyi Township
- Pindaya Township (now part of the Danu Self-Administered Zone)
- Ywangan Township (now part of the Danu Self-Administered Zone)
- Hopong Township (now part of the Pa'O Self-Administered Zone)
- Hsi Hseng Township (now part of the Pa'O Self-Administered Zone)
- Pinlaung Township (now part of the Pa'O Self-Administered Zone)
