= Gwebin =

- Village
- Location in Burma
- Coordinates: 22°54′N 96°5′E
- Country: Burma
- Region: Mandalay Region
- District: Pyin Oo Lwin District
- Township: Mogok Township
- Time zone: UTC+6.30 (MST)

Gwebin is a village in Mogok Township, Pyin Oo Lwin District, in the Mandalay Region of central Burma. It is located 16 miles (26 km) west of Mogok. A track (National Road 311 and National Highway 31) connects it to Shwenyaungbin and Mogok.

== History ==
The Mogok valley is notable for its ruby and sapphire mining, and Burma Ruby Mines Ltd. has operated in the area for decades. However, the village of Gwebin is noted in particular for its unusually large sapphire stones. On August 12, 1929, a group of laborers discovered a record 958 carat doubly truncated bipyramid sapphire near Gwebin which sold for £13,000 to a New York dealer who later cut it into nine different stones. In the Mogok valley, the crystals occur in metamorphic limestone, which due to weathering turns into a yellowish clay.

Gwebin was occupied by the Japanese during World War II. Later, the 18th Allied troops were forced to retreat in vehicles three miles to the north of Gwebin and were seen two days later at Ywathit.

In February 1994, another massive 502 carat sapphire was unearthed near Gwebin.

== Geography ==
Gwebin is located in northern-central Burma. It lies off National Road 311, which after a short way southeast of the village to Wabyudaung, merges with the National Highway 31 which connects it to the township seat of Mogok in the east. Several miles to the west of the village is the Irrawaddy River, flowing southwards. This is the country's largest river and most important commercial waterway. The 311 road connects the village to Thabeikkyin on the eastern bank of the river and to Kyaukkyi to the north of Gwebin.
