= Nawnghkio Township =

Nawnghkio Township ၸႄႈဝဵင်းၼွင်ၶဵဝ် နောင်ချိုမြို့နယ်)
- Township
- Naungcho Township
- Location in Kyaukme district

- Location within Myanmar
- Coordinates: 22°20′02″N 96°48′05″E
- Country: Myanmar
- Division: Shan State
- District: Kyaukme
- Capital: Nawnghkio

Area
  - Total: 488.44 sq mi (1,265.06 km^{2})
- Elevation: 2,750 ft (840 m)

Population (2019)
  - Total: 126,143
  - Density: 258.256/sq mi (99.7131/km^{2})
- Time zone: UTC+6:30 (MST)

Nawnghkio Township (Shan: ၸႄႈဝဵင်းၼွင်ၶဵဝ်), also known as Naungcho Township (Burmese: နောင်ချိုမြို့နယ်) is a township of Kyaukme District in the Shan State of eastern Myanmar. The principal town and administrative seat is Nawnghkio. The name 'Nawnghkio' was started to call after a camp near a green lake (Shan language: nawng = lake or natural pond, hkio = green). The lake is located in the west of 'Haw Taw Monastery' of today's Nawnghkio.

== Geography ==
The township lies between 22° 45' and 23° 15' north latitude and 96° 00' and 97° 00' east longitude. Altitude ranges from 700 feet above the sea level in the lowest to 4300 feet in the highest with an average of 2750 feet. Occupying nearly half of the center of the land is highly productive plane surrounded by mountains in north, east, south and west. Mountains of the southern region are the highest. More than half of the surface area is covered by rain forests. Average number of raining days range from 90 to 130 days per year and annual rail fall varies from 47 to 70 inches. Thunder storms struck the area in the rainy season (May to October). Being in the temperate zone, the temperature varies from 43°-81 °F in the cold season to 61°-96 °F in the hot season. Many small rivers and streams are running across the township throughout the year forming waterfalls in some places. These waterfalls include Inn Wine waterfall, Namngo waterfall, Inn Hpo waterfall, Chaunggyi Yay Pyan Taung waterfall and Thabyedoe waterfalls. A hot water spring can be seen near Seik Hpu village. Thirty small dams are constructed for irrigation. Small scale hydroelectric power is used in many places.

== Borders ==
Nawnghkio Township is bordered by:

- Thabeikkyin Township and Mogok Township to the north,
- Kyaukme Township to the northeast and east,
- Lawksawk Township to the south and
- Singu Township, Madaya Township, Pyinoolwin Township and Kyaukse Township to the west and southwest.

== Towns and villages ==
Thonze town is the administrative seat of the township in the past. On 28/April/1899, at the same time the Goteik viaduct (bridge) was started to be built across the Gokteik gorge near Nawnghkio, the seat moved to Nawnghkio. On 10/August/1961, Nawnghkio Farm Council was founded. According to official announcement letter from the Ministry of Internal Affairs dated 21/June/1972, Nawnghkio Township was organized with the following 6 wards and 35 village tracts of 249 villages:

- Nawnghkio Myoma Group of 6 wards: Zay, Bhu Tar, Taung, Par Hat, Thapyay Yay, Nar Shao
- Kone Sam village tract
- Long Yone village tract
- Ngoke Ka Lay village tract
- Long Wei village tract
- Mak Hki Nu village tract
- Nyan Taw village tract
- Kan Gyi village tract
- Shwe Moke Htaw village tract
- Taung Shey village tract (Taung Kham)
- Yae Twin Gyi village tract
- Nawng Taw village tract
- Inn Hpo village tract
- Me Poke village tract
- Thone Se village tract
- Hsam Ma Hse village tract
- Ong Ma Hkar village tract
- Pin Tee village tract
- Bant Bway village tract
- Kone Gyi Ywar Ma village tract
- Kyein Ga Naing village tract
- Ah Nauk Kyu Inn village tract
- Nyaung Tauk village tract
- Hko Ong village tract
- Kone Thar village tract
- Seik Hpu village tract
- Ku Lar Kwe village tract
- Doe Pin village tract
- Kyauk Gyi village tract
- Bant Bway Kyin village tract
- Ho Hko (North) village tract
- Hsi Hson village tract
- Kone Gyi village tract
- Than Bo village tract
- Tha Yet Kone village tract
- Ah Htet Kyu Inn village tract

== Geology ==
Myanmar's biggest earthquake, measuring 8.2 on the Richter scale, took place in 1912 along the Kyauk Kyan Fault in northern Shan State, another of the country's main faults (the first is the Sagaing Fault and the third is the Rakhine Fault). Kyaukkyan fault is one of the prominent seismotectonic feature (Lat. 22˚ 18´N – Long. 96˚ 44´E). The large earthquake of 23 May 1912 (8.0 RM) with many foreshocks and aftershocks, seems to be associated with that fault. It runs nearly north–south direction. Kyauk Kyan fault is 800 kilometres long, stretching from Shan State to southern Kayah State.

== Ethnic groups, language and religion ==
Major ethnic groups are Danu (37%), Shan (33%) and Bamar (25%) which make more than 95% of township population. Other ethnic groups are Gurkha, Kachin, Kokant, Lisu, Palaung, Chin, Karen, Rakhine, Lahu, Nepalis, Mon, Myaungzi, Indian, Chinese and Kayah. Myanmar is the official language and is used by most of the population. Different ethnic groups also use their own languages. Some of the Gurkha also use English and Kokant also use local Chinese language in use. Buddhism is the main religion (95.05%); Hinduism, Christianity and Islam are less common religions. About one-third (33%) total township population are under 18 years of age.

== Economy ==
- Agriculture is the major economy of the township (43% of township population). Rice, corn and sugarcane are main crops grown in the township. Other choices farmers are wheat, peanut, beans, sunflower, sesame, potato, flowers, coffee, damson, tea, orange, lichee, Macadamia and rubber.
- Agriculture based industry, timber extraction, charcoal production, burnt lime production, apiculture (bee keeping), and animal husbandry are other economies.
- People trade in "Every-Fifth-Day-Markets", which are well-known trading places in Shan State, situated in Nawnghkio, Kangyi, Tawnghkam, Ban Bwe, Hsumhsai, Thonse, Hokho and Thayetkon villages. Annual pagoda festivals are also popular trading places. People also trade in brokers' sales centers. Nawnghkio Myanma Economic Bank, KBZ Bank, CB Bank, Aya Bank and Myanmar Apex Banks are the available banking services of the township.
- Mining is another economic contributor to the township. Yadanar Theigi Mine is in the north most part of the township. Other smaller mines are also functional. Mines in the township are productive of various kinds of metals.

== Special Places ==
- Gokteik bridge
- Innpho Swamp situated near Innma village in Hokho village tract
- Innwine and Namp Ngo Waterfalls near Innwine village and Yay Pyan Taung Waterfall near Chaunggyi village in Seeson village tract.
- Seikhpu Hot spring
- Ancient stupas and temples: in Thonze, Myin Phyu, Thaphankaing, Shweku-letpan, Chaungtha (Hokho village tract) and Namlinkhan village
- "Saya San Cave" situated 3 kilometers southeast of Hokho village where the leader of the Burmese peasant revolt of 1930-1931 and the leader of the first concerted effort to forcefully resist British domination, Saya San, and his followers spent their last days.
- Convict camps (labor camp or prison farm or penal colony)

=== Gallery ===
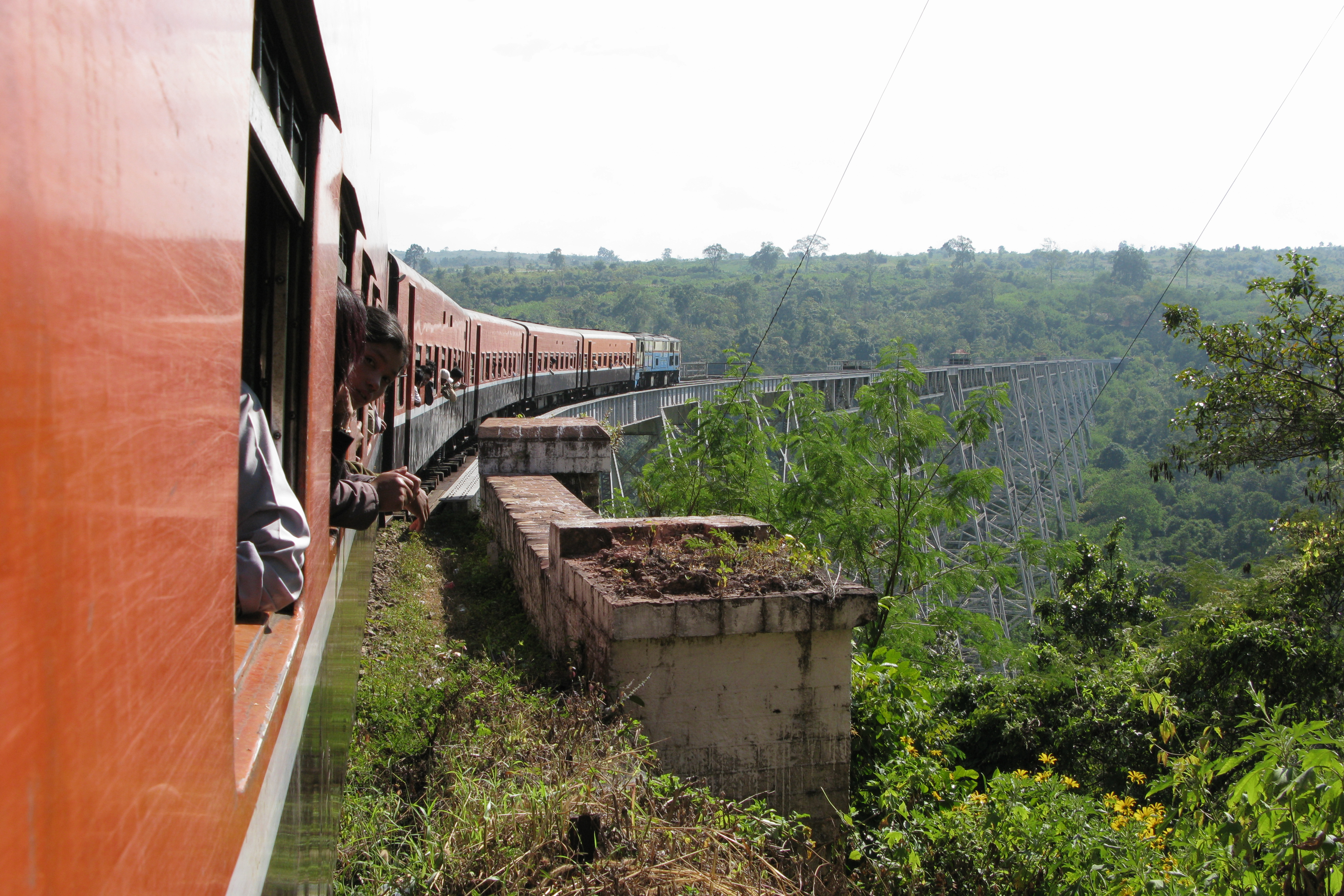
Goteik viaduct over Goteik gorge

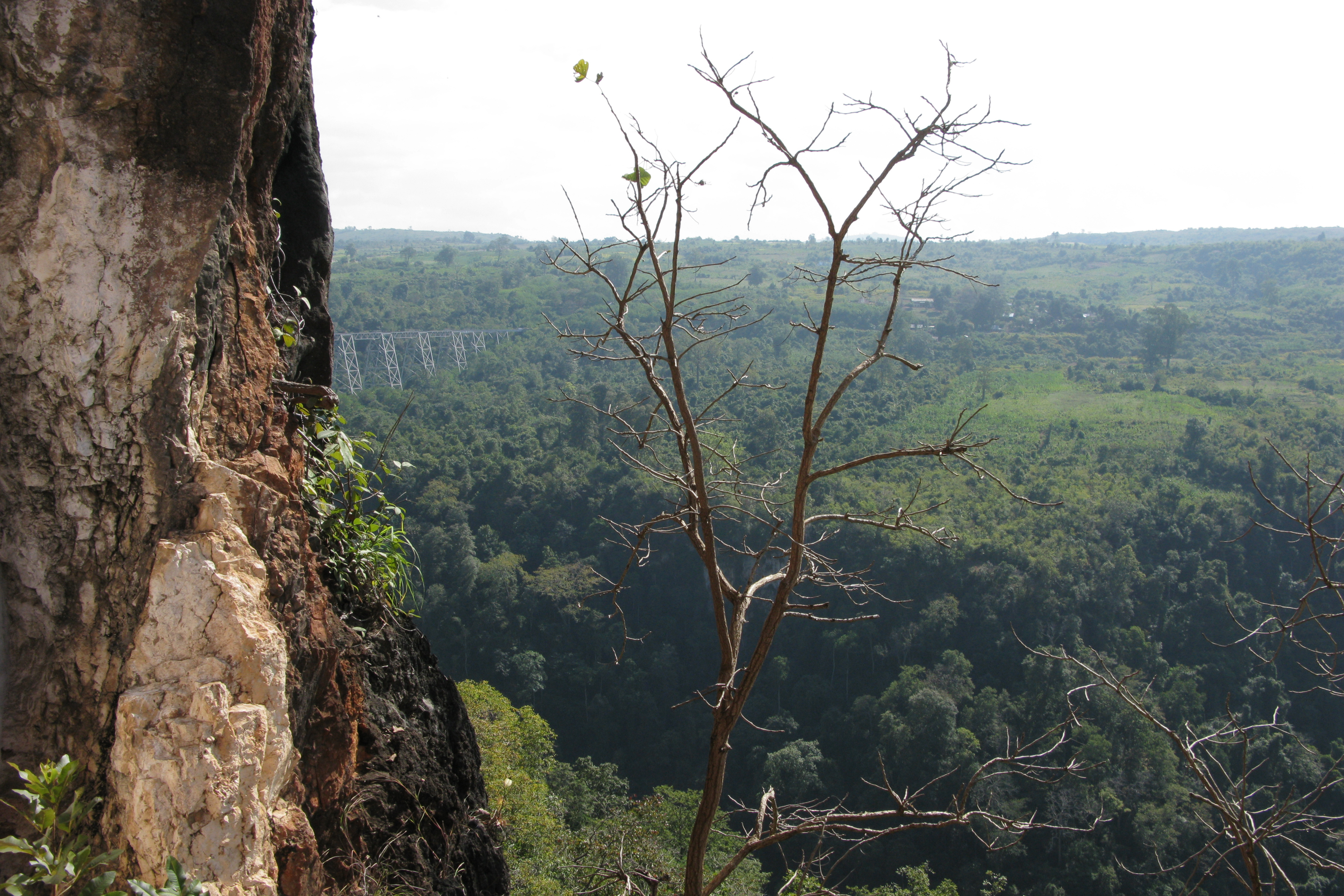
Goteik gorge

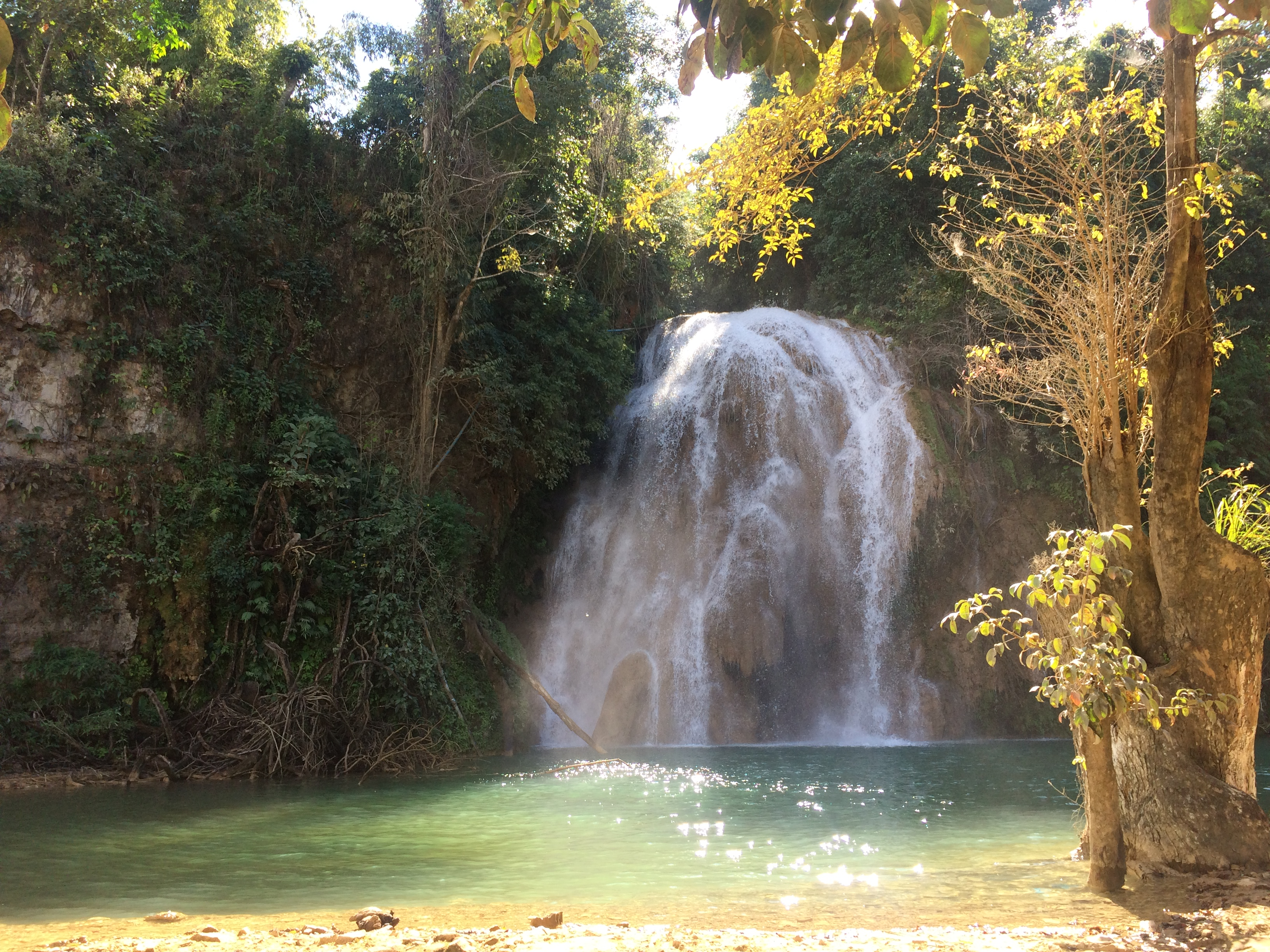
Chaunggyi waterfall

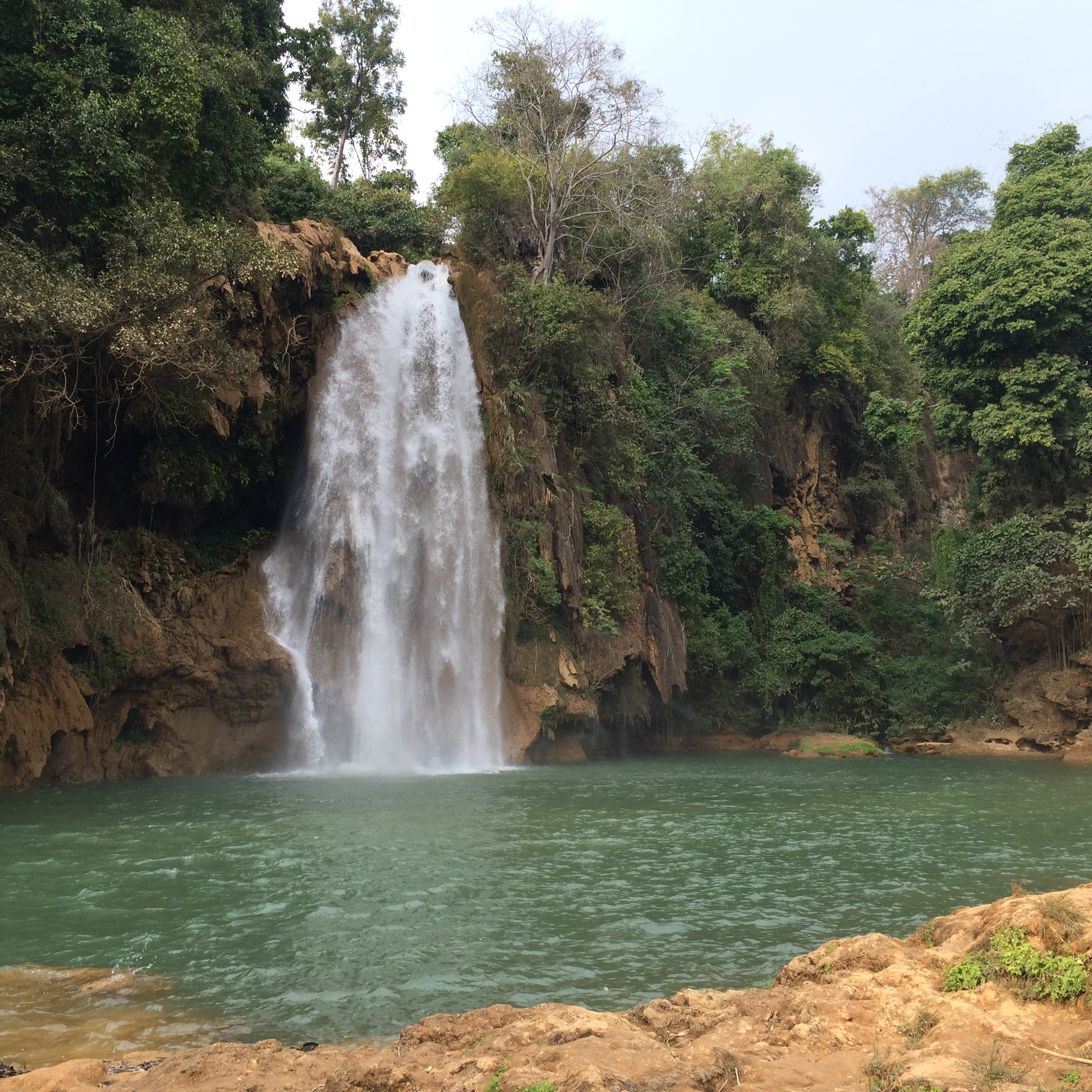
Innwine waterfall

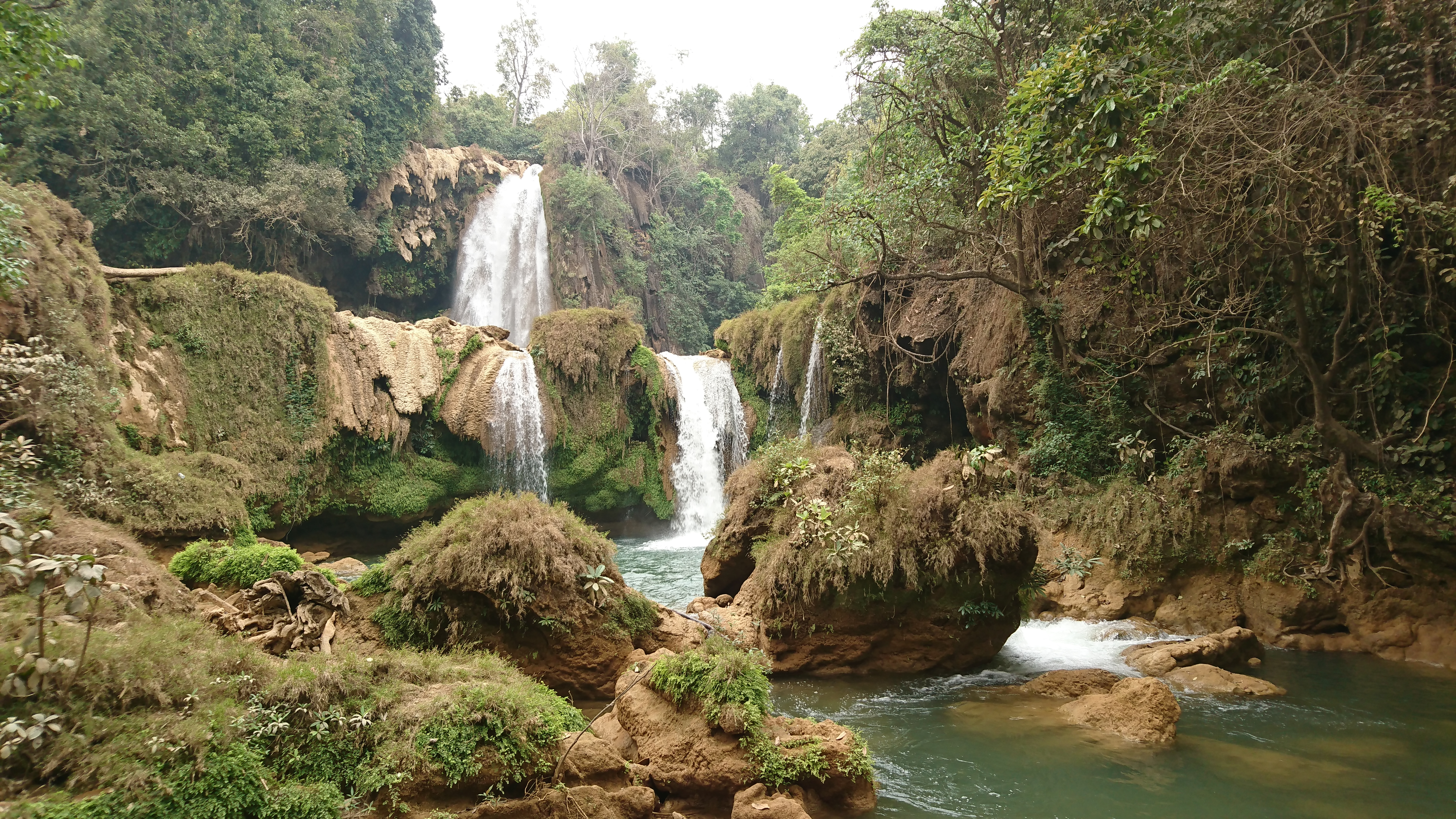
Innwine waterfall
