= Chaunggyi =

- Village
- Location within Myanmar
- Coordinates: 22°43′N 96°1′E
- Country: Burma
- Division: Mandalay Division
- District: Pyin Oo Lwin District
- Township: Tha bake kyin Township
- Elevation: 732 ft (223 m)
- Time zone: UTC+6:30 (MMT)

Chaoggyi Village is a village located in Thabeikkyin Township, Pyin Oo Lwin District, Mandalay Region, Myanmar.

On 30 June 2024, the town fell to the People's Defense Force during the Myanmar civil war.

== Geography ==
The Chaunggyi valley is located about 3,5 km northeast of Letha Taung, also known as the Singu Plateau, near National Highway 31. In the valley there are Lisu (at Lezawchaunggyi), Palaung (at Palaungchaunggyi), Shan and Gurkha ethnic minorities living in separate villages.
