= Yenatha, Madaya =

Yenatha
- Village
- Location in Burma
- Coordinates: 22°18′N 96°9′E
- Country: Burma
- Region: Mandalay Region
- District: Pyin Oo Lwin District
- Township: Madaya Township
- Time zone: UTC+6.30 (MST)

Yenatha or Yentha is a village in Madaya Township, Pyin Oo Lwin District, in the Mandalay Region of central Burma. It is located 7 miles northeast of Madaya, connected by the National Highway 31. The Japanese were reported to have "put up pockets of resistance" at Yenatha during World War II. The Madaya River flows nearby to the south and joins the Irrawaddy River as well as the Yenatha Canal as part of the Mandalay Canal network. The Yenatha Irrigation Scheme has been funded by the Asian Development Bank, who recognizes the importance and potential of agriculture and fisheries in the area. The canal involves a pump irrigation scheme and cost some 9,900,000 kyat to build. A Leprosy hospital lies to the south of Yenatha.
