= Letkhokpin =

- Village
- Location within Myanmar
- Coordinates: 22°39′N 96°1′E
- Country: Burma
- Division: Mandalay Division
- District: Pyin Oo Lwin District
- Township: Singu Township
- Elevation: 416 ft (127 m)
- Time zone: UTC+6:30 (MMT)

Letkhokpin is a village in Singu Township, Pyinoolwin District, Mandalay Division, Myanmar.

It is located about 3,5 km southeast of Letha Taung, also known as the Singu Plateau, near National Highway 31.
