= Nweyon =

- Village
- Location within Myanmar
- Coordinates: 22°53′N 96°7′E
- Country: Burma
- Division: Mandalay Division
- District: Pyin Oo Lwin District
- Township: Singu Township
- Elevation: 497 ft (151 m)
- Time zone: UTC+6:30 (MMT)

Nweyon is a village in Singu Township, Pyinoolwin District, Mandalay Division, Myanmar.

It is located about 2 km east of Letha Taung, also known as the Singu Plateau, near National Highway 31.

The town was captured by the People's Defense Force on 1 July 2024, during the Myanmar civil war.
