= Shwenyaungbin =

- Village
- Location in Burma
- Coordinates: 22°55′49″N 96°18′51″E
- Country: Burma
- Region: Mandalay Region
- District: Pyin Oo Lwin District
- Township: Mogok Township
- Time zone: UTC+6.30 (MST)

Shwenyaungbin, also Shwe-nyaung-bin or Schwenyaungbiri, is a large village in Mogok Township, Pyin Oo Lwin District, in the Mandalay Region of central Burma. It is located west of Mogok. It lies at a meander on the Kin River and the National Highway 31 (Tonga Road), which connects it to Kyatpyin and Mogok in the east.

== History ==
Historically during the Sino–Burmese War (1765–1769), the Qing army in 1769 built a massive stockade (described as being "as big as a city") at Shwenyaungbin until Maha Thiha Thura took the offensive. The Burmese successfully attacked one of the walls of the fortress and in the end they agreed to a Peace Treaty with the Chinese.

Seventh-day Adventist missionaries once had a station in Shwenyaungbin but missionaries such as Chit Maung and his wife and several others were driven out due to religious conflict in the region.

On October 22, 1976, the village was attacked by the Kachin Independence Army, which reportedly killed 11 people and wounded others during their attack and retreat from the Waingmaw area. A private of the 253rd Battalion surrendered at Shwenyaungbin camp, three new recruits of the 3rd Battalion surrendered at Bhamo garrison and another of the 3rd Battalion at Washawng.

== Economy ==
Shwenyaungbin is part of the Ruby Mines District of the Mogok valley which is renowned for its ruby and sapphire mining. It contains a post office, a police station in the village circle and a public works department.

== Wildlife ==
Shwenyaungbin lies in a hilly area, rich with wildlife. Elephant inhabit the jungle to the west of the village, rhinoceros in the hills to the north, and barking deer, tigers, leopard, bear, wild pig, pheasant, peacock and partridges have also been sighted in the area.
