= Chaungywa =

- Village
- Location within Myanmar
- Coordinates: 22°29′N 96°0′E
- Country: Burma
- Division: Mandalay Division
- District: Pyin Oo Lwin District
- Township: Singu Township
- Elevation: 80 ft (24 m)
- Time zone: UTC+6:30 (MMT)

Chaungywa is a village in Singu Township, Pyinoolwin District, Mandalay Division, Myanmar.

It is a riverside town located by the Irrawaddy about 2 km south of Singu.
