= Lamaing, Madaya =

Lamaing
- Village
- Location in Burma
- Coordinates: 22°55′49″N 96°18′51″E
- Country: Burma
- Region: Mandalay Region
- District: Pyin Oo Lwin District
- Township: Madaya Township
- Time zone: UTC+6.30 (MST)

Lamaing is a village in Madaya Township, Pyin Oo Lwin District, in the Mandalay Region of central Burma. It is located southeast of Madaya and north of Mandalay, connected along the National Highway 31. On October 1, 1886 there was a reported small native garrison at Lamaing.
