= Kyauktawgyi Buddha =

Kyauktawgyi Buddha may refer to:

- Kyauktawgyi Buddha Temple (Yangon)
- Kyauktawgyi Buddha Temple (Mandalay)
- Kyauktawgyi Buddha Temple (Amarapura)
