= Marle, Singu =

Marle မာလဲ
- Village
- Location within Myanmar
- Coordinates: 22°34′33″N 96°05′35″E
- Country: Myanmar
- Region: Mandalay Region
- District: Pyin Oo Lwin District
- Township: Singu Township
- Village: Marle
- Time zone: UTC+6:30 (MMT)

Marle is a village in Singu Township, Mandalay Region of Myanmar.
