= Shwebaung =

- Location in Burma
- Coordinates: 22°8′N 96°3′E
- Country: Burma
- Division: Mandalay Division
- District: Pyin Oo Lwin District
- Township: Madaya Township

Population (2005)
  - Religions: Buddhism
- Time zone: UTC+6.30 (MST)

Shwebaung is a village in Madaya Township in Pyin Oo Lwin District in the Mandalay Division of central Burma. It lies just south east of Thapandaung.
