= Thapandaung =

- Location in Burma
- Coordinates: 22°8′N 96°2′E
- Country: Burma
- Division: Mandalay
- District: Pyin Oo Lwin District
- Township: Madaya Township

Population (2005)
  - Religions: Buddhism
- Time zone: UTC+6.30 (MST)

Thapandaung is a village in Madaya Township in Pyin Oo Lwin District in the Mandalay Division of central Myanmar. It lies just outside the north west of Mandalay city and on the Ayeyarwady River.

It lies across the river from Aingdaing and is several kilometers up river from Dingagyun.
