= Madaya =

Madaya may refer to:

- Madaya, Syria, a town in Syria
- Madaya Township, a township in Myanmar containing:
  - Madaya, Myanmar, a town
