= Sinywagale =

- Location in Burma
- Coordinates: 22°4′0″N 96°5′0″E
- Country: Burma
- Division: Mandalay Division
- District: Pyin Oo Lwin District
- Township: Madaya Township

Population (2005)
  - Religions: Buddhism
- Time zone: UTC+6.30 (MST)

Sinywagale is a village in Madaya Township in Pyin Oo Lwin District in the Mandalay Division of central Myanmar. It lies approximately 15 kilometres north of Mandalay city.
