= Kyawngtet =

- Village
- Location in Burma
- Coordinates: 20°27′N 97°14′E
- Country: Burma
- State: Shan State
- District: Taunggyi District
- Township: Hsi Hseng Township
- Time zone: UTC+6.30 (MST)

Kyawngtet is a village in Hsi Hseng Township, Taunggyi District, in the Shan State of eastern Burma. It is located just to the south of Banyin and to the north of Loisawn along the National Highway 5.
