= Kalaw–Lawksawk Railway =

Railway line in Myanmar

Kalaw–Lawksawk Railway ကလော-ရပ်စောက် ရထားလမ်း
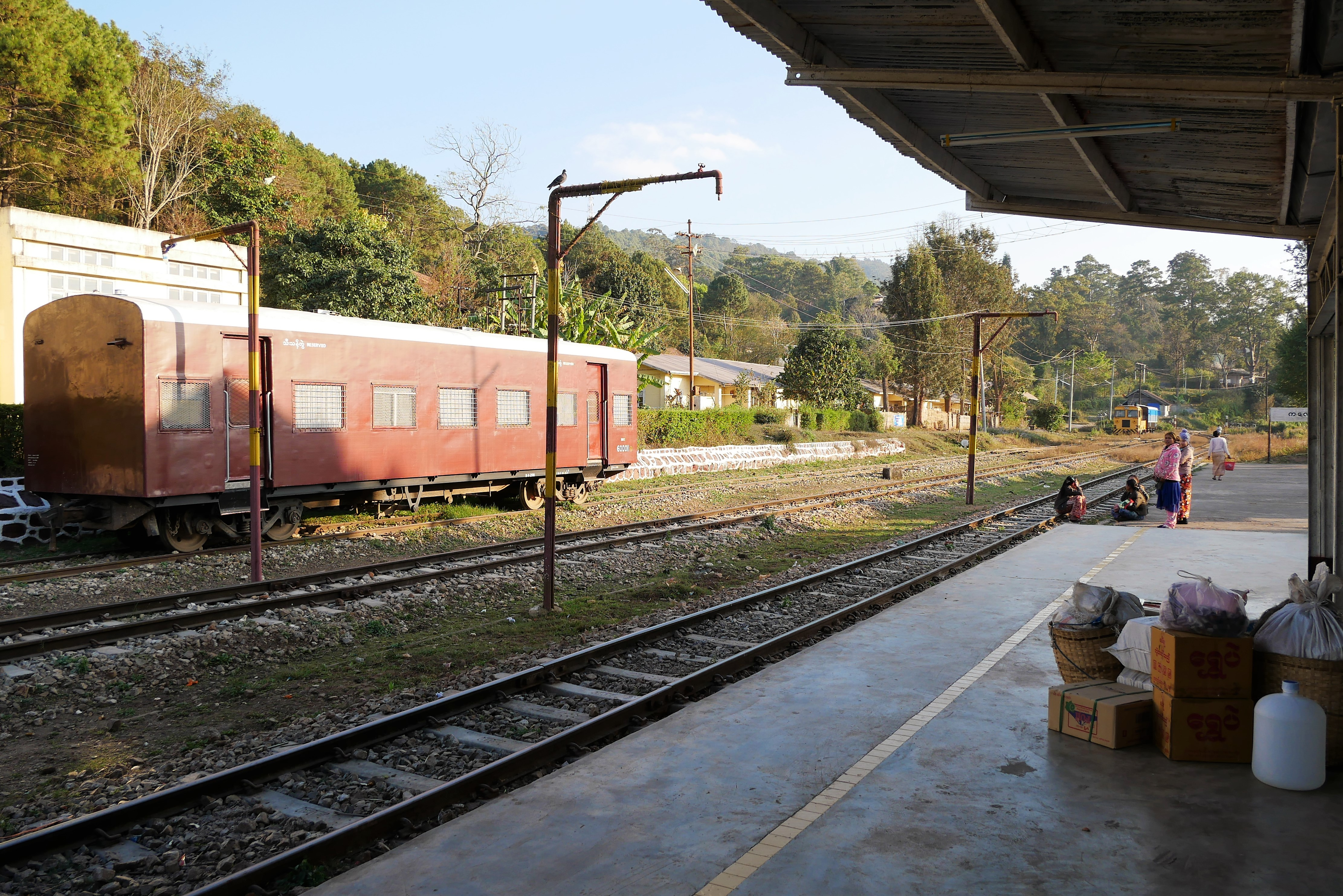
- Kalaw Station

Overview
- Owner: Myanma Railways
- Locale: Kalaw Station–Lawksawk Station
- Number of stations: 16

Operation
- Began operation: March 27, 1991

Technical
- System length: 37.3 mi (60.0 km)
- Track gauge: 1,000 mm (3 ft 3 3/8 in)

Kalaw–Yatsauk Railway is a 1000 mm (3 ft 3 3/8 in) meter-gauge railway line constructed to connect Shwenyaung with Yatsauk. The total length of the railway line is 37.3 miles.

== History ==
In 1936, the British government planned to extend a railway line from Shwenyaung to Hsipaw, linking with the Mandalay–Lashio railway. However, the project was never realized due to the outbreak of World War II. In the 1990s, the State Law and Order Restoration Council (SLORC) initiated a series of new railway construction projects across Myanmar. As part of this expansion, the Shwenyaung–Yatsauk section was completed, and the railway line officially opened on March 27, 1991.

== Stations ==
- (1) Kalaw 369
- (18) Aungpan 376 (Junction) to Loikaw 478
- (52) Kan Na 384 3/4
- (53) He Ho 392 3/4 Spiral railroad
- (54) Shwe Nyaung 404 (Junction) to Moene
- (55) He Ke 407 1/4
- (56) Taung Ni 410 1/2
- (57) Yae Pu -
- (58) Kwin Lon 418 3/4
- (59) Ban Kan -
- (60) Htee Hkan 422 3/4
- (61) Pin Hpyit 426 1/4
- (62) Yadana Pon 430 1/4
- (63) Nyaung Htan Pin -
- (64) Yae Hpyu 435 1/4
- (65) Lawksawk (Yat Sauk) 441 1/2
