= Mwe Pon Kan =

Village and small island in Madaya Township, Myanmar

Mwe Pon Kan is a village and small island in Madaya Township of Myanmar. It is located in the Pyin Oo Lwin District of the Mandalay Division, in central Myanmar. It lies just outside the north of Mandalay city and beside the Ayeyarwady river.
