= Shwenyaung–Mongnai Railway =

Railway line in Myanmar

Shwenyaung-MongNai Railway ရွှေညောင်-မိုးနဲ ရထားလမ်း
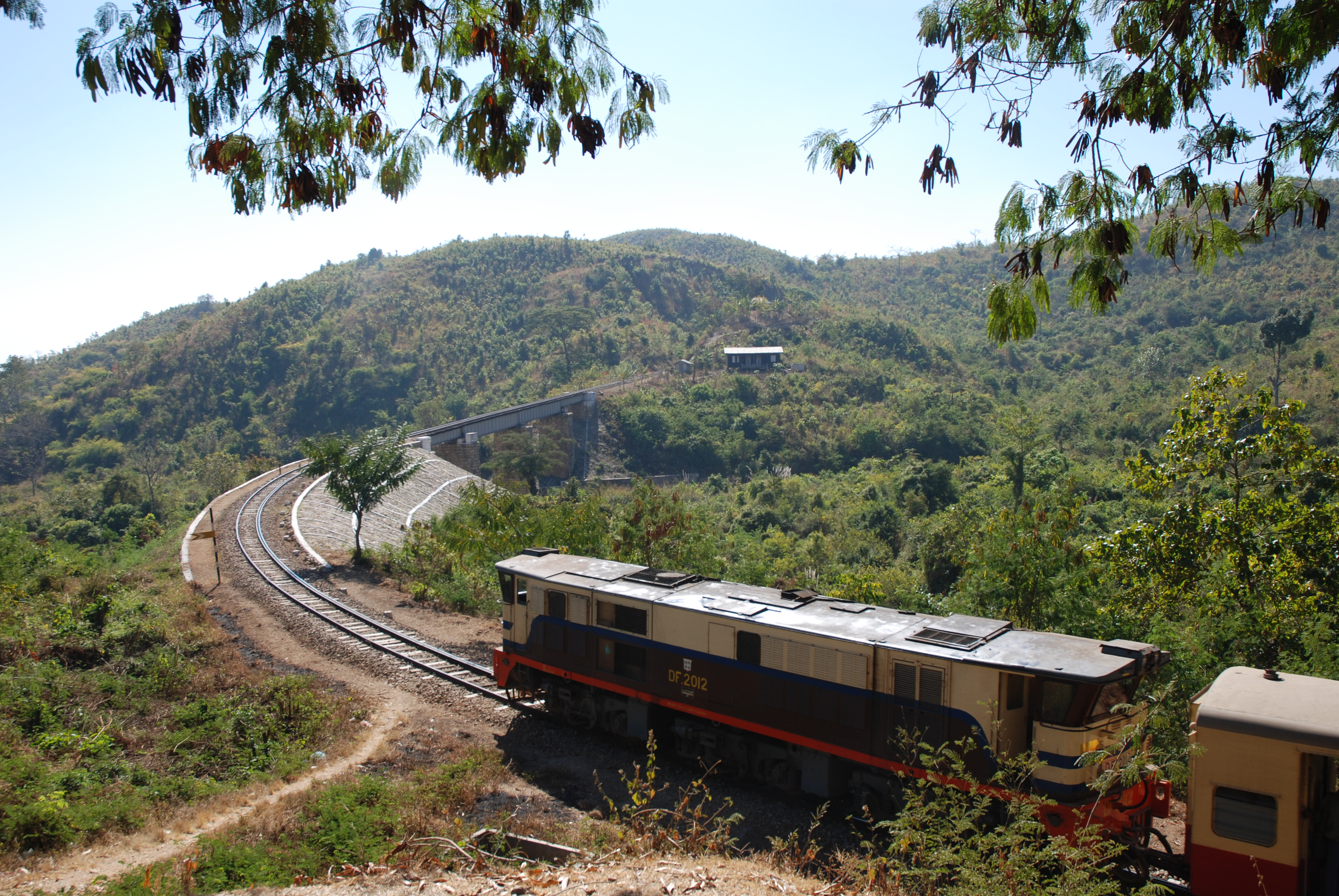

Overview
- Owner: Myanma Railways
- Locale: Shwenyang - Mongnai
- Number of stations: 16

Operation
- Began operation: Dec 12, 1997

Technical
- System length: 395.8 m
- Track gauge: 1,000 mm (3 ft 3 3/8 in)

Shwenyaung–Mong Nai Railway is a 1000 mm (3 ft 3 3/8 in) meter-gauge railway line, originally designed to connect Shwenyaung to Taunggyi, Banyin, and Mong Nai in Shan State, Myanmar. Plans were made to extend the line from Mong Nai to Kyaingtong, though this extension was never completed.

== History ==
During the 1990s, the government of Myanmar initiated plans to construct a series of railway sections aimed at improving transportation links in Shan State. These plans included the Thazi–Shwenyaung railway, as well as sections connecting Shwenyaung to Taunggyi, Banyein to Namsan, and Namsan to Kyaingtong. Although construction reached Shwenyaung, the project faced significant delays due to the region's mountainous terrain.

In 1996, construction resumed, and several key sections were completed:

- The Phapoon–Banyein section was opened on April 4, 1996.
- The Phapoon–Taunggyi section followed on July 27, 1996.
- The Banyein–Namsan section was completed on January 1, 2006.

While Shwenyaung and Taunggyi are relatively close in distance, Taunggyi sits approximately 500 meters higher in elevation, making construction particularly challenging. Initial plans included the use of zig zag railways to navigate the steep terrain. However, it was ultimately decided to use the gentler slopes to the north of Shwenyaung, extending to Ayethaya. The Shwenyaung–Taunggyi section was officially opened on December 24, 1997.

Although passenger trains briefly operated on this route, poor track conditions eventually limited the line to freight services. In 2022, repair and restoration work began, including efforts to revive the railway as part of the second spiral (railway) project, which aimed to modernize several critical sections.

=== Extension Plans and Discontinuation ===
The Mong Nai–Kyaingtong Railway was part of a broader plan to connect southern Shan State with its eastern regions. On April 4, 2009, construction began on the Kyaingtong section, which spanned 5.6 miles, with a rail length of 6.6 miles. The line was opened on December 19, 2010, but was never operational due to technical issues, leading Myanma Railways to dismantle the tracks.

In 2022, the Ministry of Transport and Communications, under the direction of Minister U Thant Sin Maung, repurposed the dismantled tracks for a bypass road project during his visit to Kyaingtong on February 23.

The construction of these railway sections was part of a larger national infrastructure initiative led by the State Peace and Development Council. Despite the ambitious goals, some sections were discontinued due to a lack of usability, with the Kyaingtong section being decommissioned shortly after its completion.

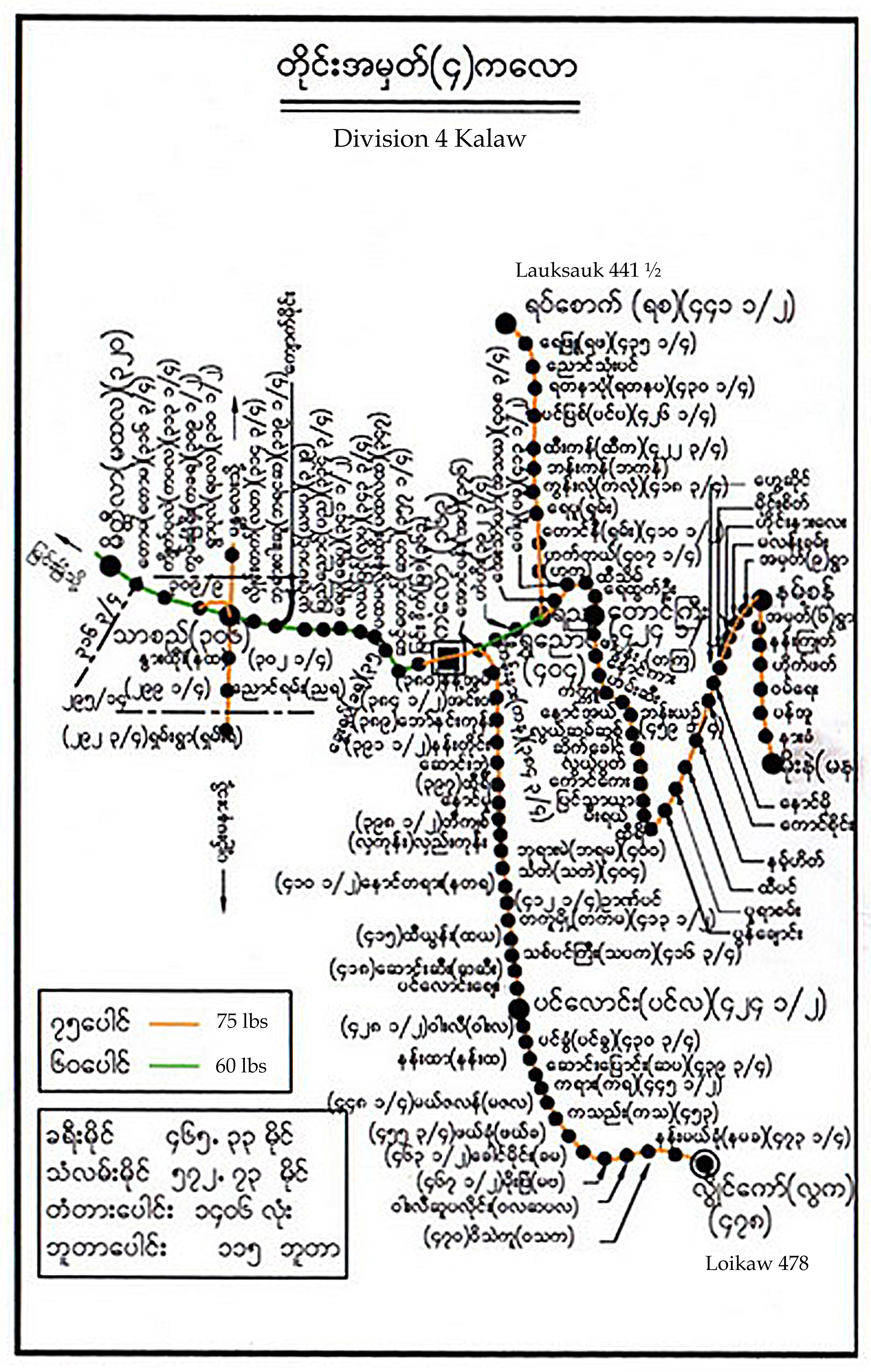
Myanmar Railways station map Division 4 Kalaw

== Stations ==
- (54) Shwe Nyaung 404 (Junction) to Lawksauk 441 1/2
- (66) Aye Tha Ya 408 3/4
- (67) Paw Mu 413 1/2
- (68) Hti Thin -
- (69) Ye Twe-U -
- (70) Taunggyi 424 1/2
- (71) Hpa Mun -
- (72) Naung Kar -
- (73) Hang Si -
- (74) Kek Ku -
- (75) Naung Ae -
- (76) Ban Yin 459 3/4
- (77) Loi Hsan Sit -
- (78) Hsaik Hkaung -
- (79) Loi Pu -
- (80) Kaung Ke -
- (81) Pyin Tha Ya -
- (82) Mi Ye -
- (83) Thi Yi -
- (84) Pwin Chaung -
- (85) Pu Ya Sin -
- (86) Thi Pin -
- (87) Nam Hu -
- (88) Kaung Maing -
- (89) Naung Mo -
- (90) Hwe Hse -
- (91) Maing Sit -
- (92) Haing Na Nge La -
- (93) Ma Lan Hkam -
- (94) Ah Hma 5 Ywa -
- (95) Nansang -
- (96) Ah Hma 6 Ywa -
- (97) Nan Kyu -
- (98) Haik Hpa -
- (99) Wan Ye -
- (100) Pang Au -
- (101) Na Hkan -
- (102) Mong Nai (Moene) -
