= Okpo, Madaya =

Okpo
- Village
- Location in Burma
- Coordinates: 22°17′N 96°16′E
- Country: Myanmar
- Region: Mandalay Region
- District: Pyin Oo Lwin District
- Township: Madaya Township
- Time zone: UTC+6.30 (MST)

Okpo is a village in Madaya Township, Pyin Oo Lwin District, in the Mandalay Region of central Myanmar. It is located northeast of Madaya and lies on the Mandalay Canal, just south of the Madaya River. In the 16th century, the Gwe Shans built a stockade in the village.
