= Kyauktawgyi Buddha Temple (Yangon) =

Buddhist temple in Yangon, Myanmar

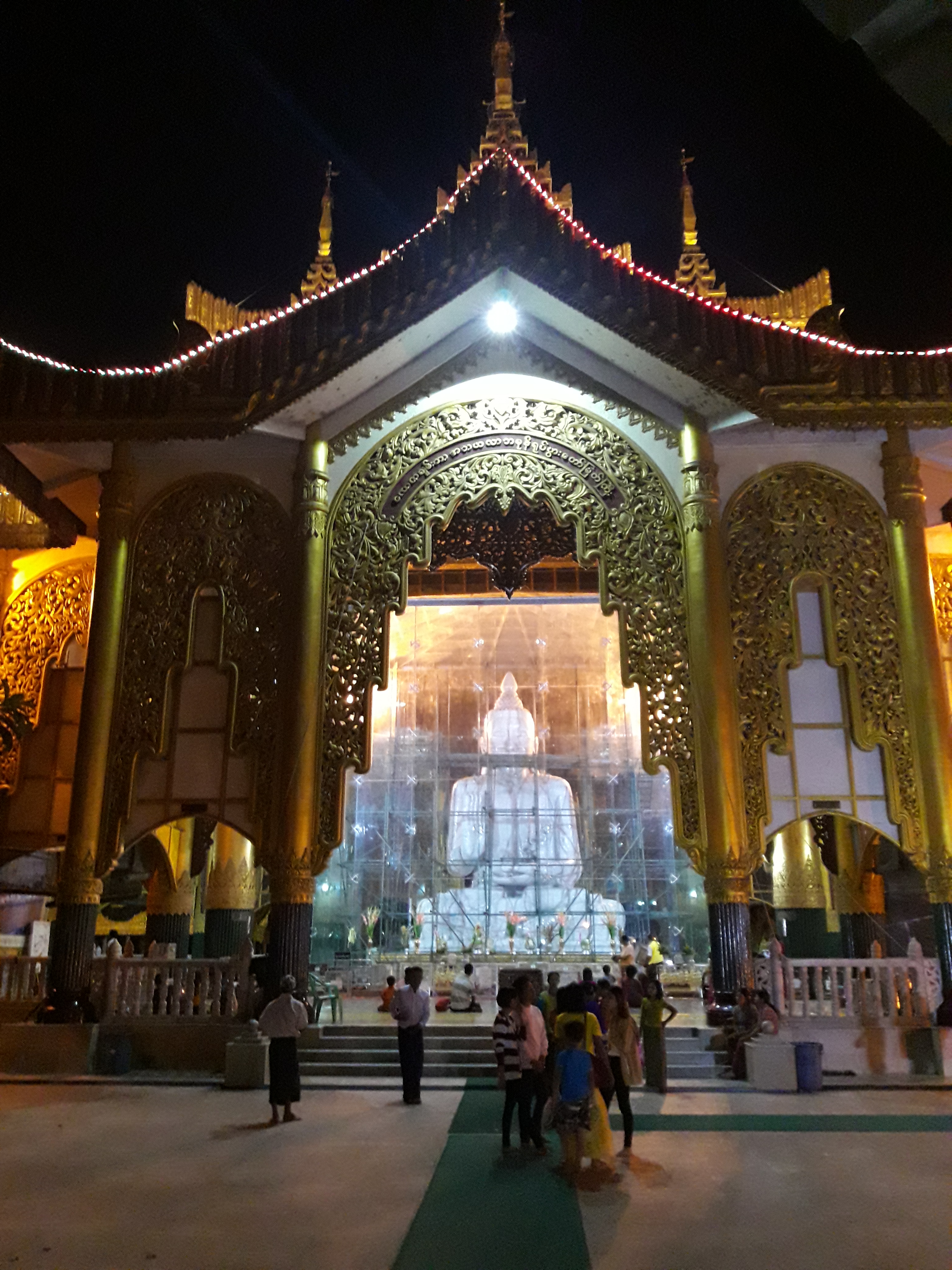

- Location within Myanmar

Religion
- Affiliation: Buddhism
- Rite: Theravada

Location
- Location: Insein Township, Yangon
- Country: Myanmar
- Coordinates: 16.884581°N 96.123207°E

Architecture
- Founder: Than Shwe
- Completed: February 2002; 24 years ago

Kyauktawgyi Buddha Temple (Burmese: ကျောက်တော်ကြီးဘုရား) is a Buddhist temple located on Mindhamma Hill on Insein Township, Yangon, Burma. The temple houses a 37 feet (11 m) tall Buddha called the Loka Chantha Abhaya Labha Muni (လောကချမ်းသာအဘယလဘ မုနိရုပ်ပွားတော်မြတ်ကြီး), which is carved out of a single piece of white marble quarried in Sagyin Hill, Madaya Township, Mandalay Region. The image weighs approximately 560 tons. The Buddha is carved making the abhayamudra (အဘယမုဒြာ), the gesture of fearlessness.

The marble image was transported using a special railroad carriage, which was then placed on a 200 feet (61 m) long barge donated by the Metro Asia Myanmar. The barge was pushed down the Irrawaddy River by three steamers, stopping along major towns before reaching Yangon. The barge was accompanied by a fleet of decorated ceremonial boats.

The marble image landed at Gyogon, Insein Township on 5 August 2000 to an audience of 500,000 people, including government officials from the State Peace and Development Council, including Chairman Senior General Than Shwe, his wife Kyaing Kyaing, and Secretary 1 General Khin Nyunt. The image was then carried atop Mindhamma Hill using a special railway carriage requiring 4 locomotives, on 10 August. The partially carved image was finished and erected at an auspicious location designated by astrologers (aung myay, lit. 'victory grounds'), where it is currently housed. The Buddha image was consecrated in February 2002. This Buddhist project was reportedly a donation to sustain for future shine brightly to Buddha Sasanar. The Kyauktawgyi Buddha Temple was built near the site of the former Nine Mile Cemetery.

== Gallery ==
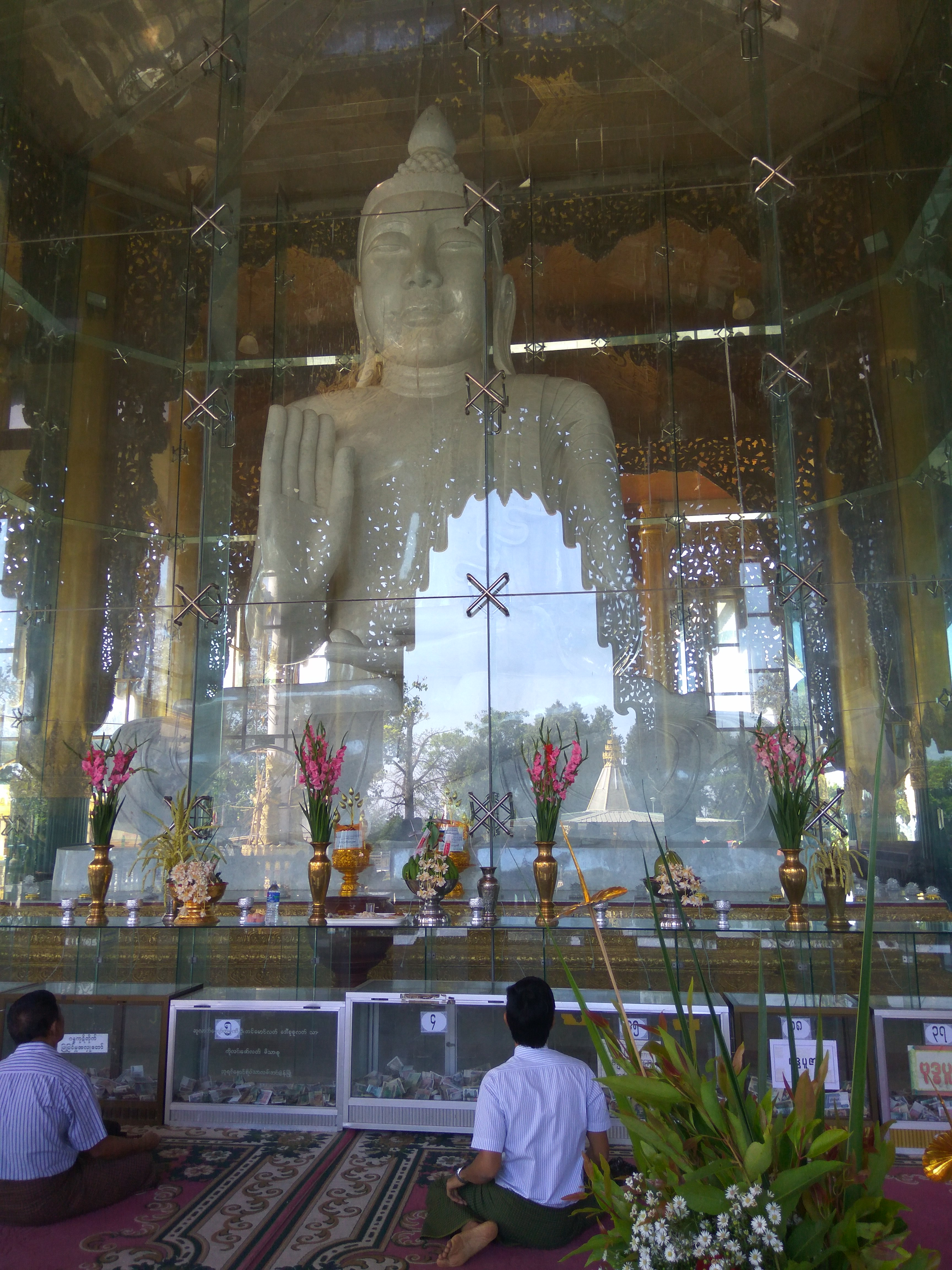
Kyauktawgyi buddha
