= Thet Thet Wai =

Burmese bodybuilder

- Professional bodybuilder

Personal info
- Born: 16 February 1996 (age 30); Myanmar

Best statistics
- Height: 152 cm (5 ft 0 in)

Thet Thet Wai (Burmese: သက်သက်ဝေ; born 16 February 1996) also known as Bora, is a Burmese bodybuilder and an activist for harsher penalties for rape.

== Competitive placings ==
- VX Bikini Model 2017 - Third Prize (Open Category)
- Bodybuilding and Physique Competition on Olympic Day 2018 - Second Prize (Under 5’ 3’’ Model Physique Category)
- Yangon Region Women's Athletic Physique Competition 2018 - First Prize (Under 5’ 3’’ Model Physique Category)

== Activism ==
Thet Thet Wai has been active in campaigning justice for a young girl who was raped and murdered in Madaya in February 2018. This case became part of a national conversation about harsher punishments for rapists. She signed a petition circulating on Facebook calling on parliament to issue the death sentence for rapists.

After she signed the petition, the Women's Protection Organization approached Thet Thet Wai for a statement of support, and she became one of many internet celebrities — including models and singers — leading the campaign to advocate for the death sentence for rapists. That campaign is called "Death to Rapists".

In June, a motion on the death penalty for child rapists was brought to Myanmar's House of Representatives. It was a close call — over a third voted in favor of the motion, which will be kept on record as parliament draws up a separate bill to address violence against women and children.

== Personal life ==
Thet Thet Wai was born on 16 February 1996 in Myanmar. She graduated with a degree in business management in 2016.
