= Sinkwa =

Sinkwa may refer to:

- The Swazi word for bread
- Sinkwa, Mogok, city in the Mogok Township, Burma

== See also ==
- Luffa acutangula, plant also known by name "sinkwa towelsponge" in English
