= Thabeikkyin District =

Thabeikkyin District သပိတ်ကျင်းခရိုင်
- District
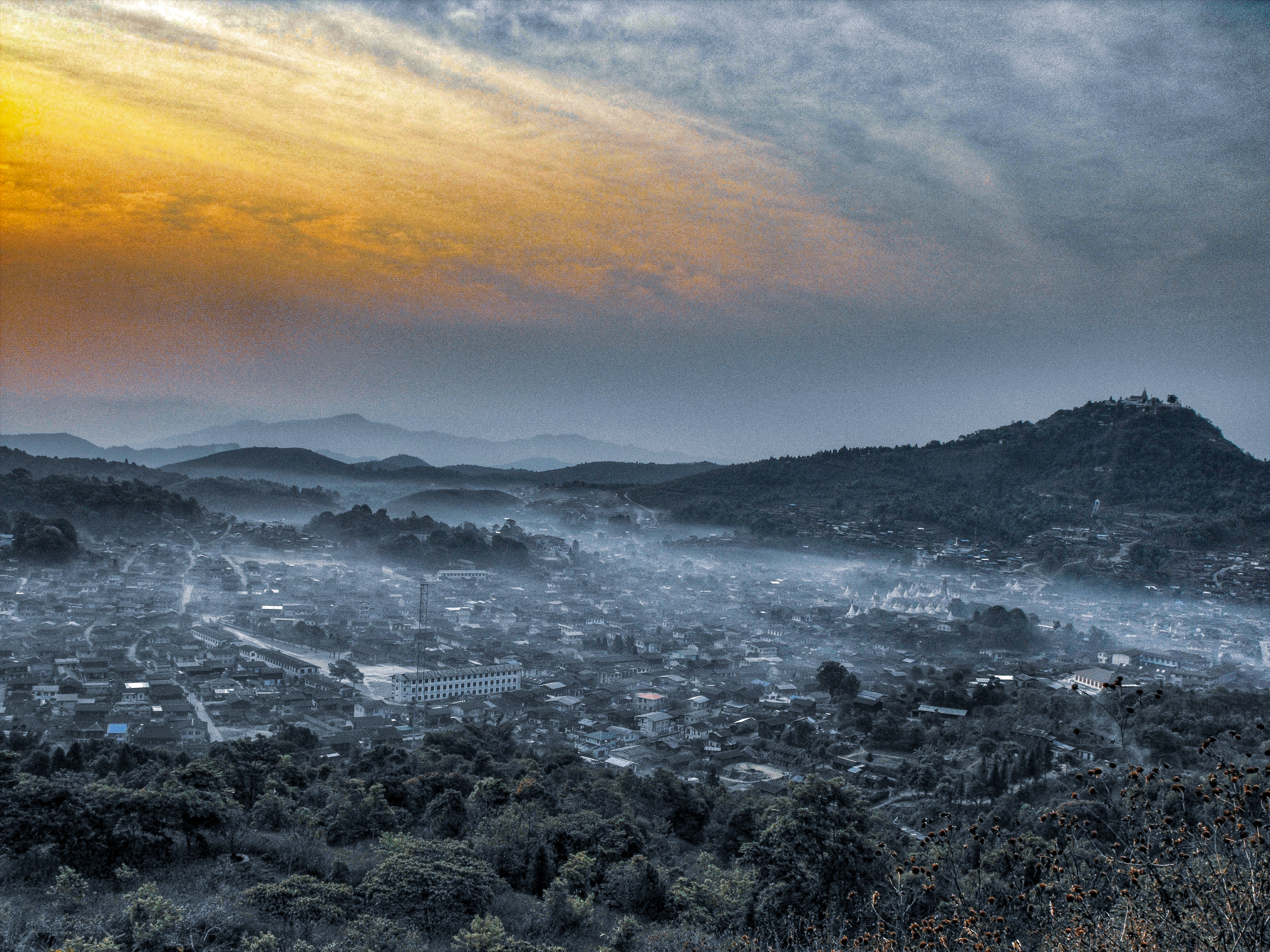
- Near the town of Mogok

- location in Mandalay region

- Location in Burma
- Coordinates: 22°53′0″N 95°58′0″E
- Country: Myanmar
- Region: Mandalay
- Time zone: UTC6:30 (MST)

Thabeikkyin District (Burmese: သပိတ်ကျင်း ခရိုင်) is the northernmost district of Mandalay Region, Myanmar. Its principal town is Thabeikkyin.

== Townships ==
Townships of Thabeikkyin District Thabeikkyin Township Singu Township Mogok Township

The townships, cities, towns that are included in Thabeikkyin District are as follows:

- Thabeikkyin Township
  - Thabeikkyin
  - Tagaung
- Singu Township
  - Singu
- Mogok Township
  - Mogok

== History ==
On April 30, 2022, new districts were expanded and organized. Thabeikkyin, Singu and Mogok Townships from Pyinoolwin District were formed as Thabeikkyin District.
