= N Kai Ra =

Burmese pop singer of Kachin descent

N Kai Ra Nကိုင်ရာ
- Born: Mogok, Burma
- Genres: Burmese pop
- Instrument: Voice
- Years active: 2000s-present
- Spouse: Mahaw Phone Aung (m. 2014)

N Kai Ra (Burmese: Nကိုင်ရာ) is a Burmese pop singer of Shan-Kachin descent. A native of Mogok, she married Mahaw Phone Aung (M Phung Awng) in January 2014. She has two children.

== Discography ==
- Lady Kai Ra (လေဒီကိုင်ရာ) (2013)
