= Nine Mile Cemetery =

Former cemetery in Yangon, Myanmar

- Interactive map of Nine Mile Cemetery

Details
- Closed: 1996–1997
- Location: Mingaladon Township, Yangon
- Country: Myanmar
- Coordinates: 16°52′50″N 96°7′45″E

Nine Mile Cemetery (Burmese: ကိုးမိုင်သင်္ချိုင်း) was an ethnic Chinese cemetery located in Yangon, Myanmar.

In 1996, the Burmese government announced that the cemetery would be demolished and that remains were to be relocated to Yayway Cemetery. Under the cemetery relocation projects, the interred remains were reburied at Yayway Cemetery, located on the outskirts of the city. The Kyauktawgyi Buddha Temple on Mindhamma Hill was built near the site of the former cemetery.
