= Dingagyun =

- Location in Burma
- Coordinates: 22°6′N 96°2′E
- Country: Burma
- Division: Mandalay
- District: Pyin Oo Lwin District
- Township: Madaya Township

Population (2005)
  - Religions: Buddhism
- Time zone: UTC+6.30 (MST)

Dingagyun is a village in Madaya Township in Pyin Oo Lwin District in the Mandalay Division of central Myanmar. It lies north west of Mandalay city and on the Ayeyarwady River.
