= Singu =

Singu စဉ့်ကူး
- Town
- Location in Burma
- Coordinates: 22.549781°N 95.998993°E
- Country: Myanmar
- Division: Mandalay Region
- District: Thabeikkyin District
- Township: Singu Township

Population
  - Religions: Buddhism
- Time zone: UTC+6.30 (MST)

Singu is a town in the Mandalay Region of central Myanmar. It is the capital of Singu Township. In July 2024, the town fell to the Mandalay People's Defense Force. The Tatmadaw junta retook the town on 18 December 2025.

== Geography ==
Singu is located by the Irrawaddy about 55 km to the south of Letha Taung, also known as the Singu Plateau.
