= Shwenyaung =

Shwenyaung ရွှေညောင်
- Town
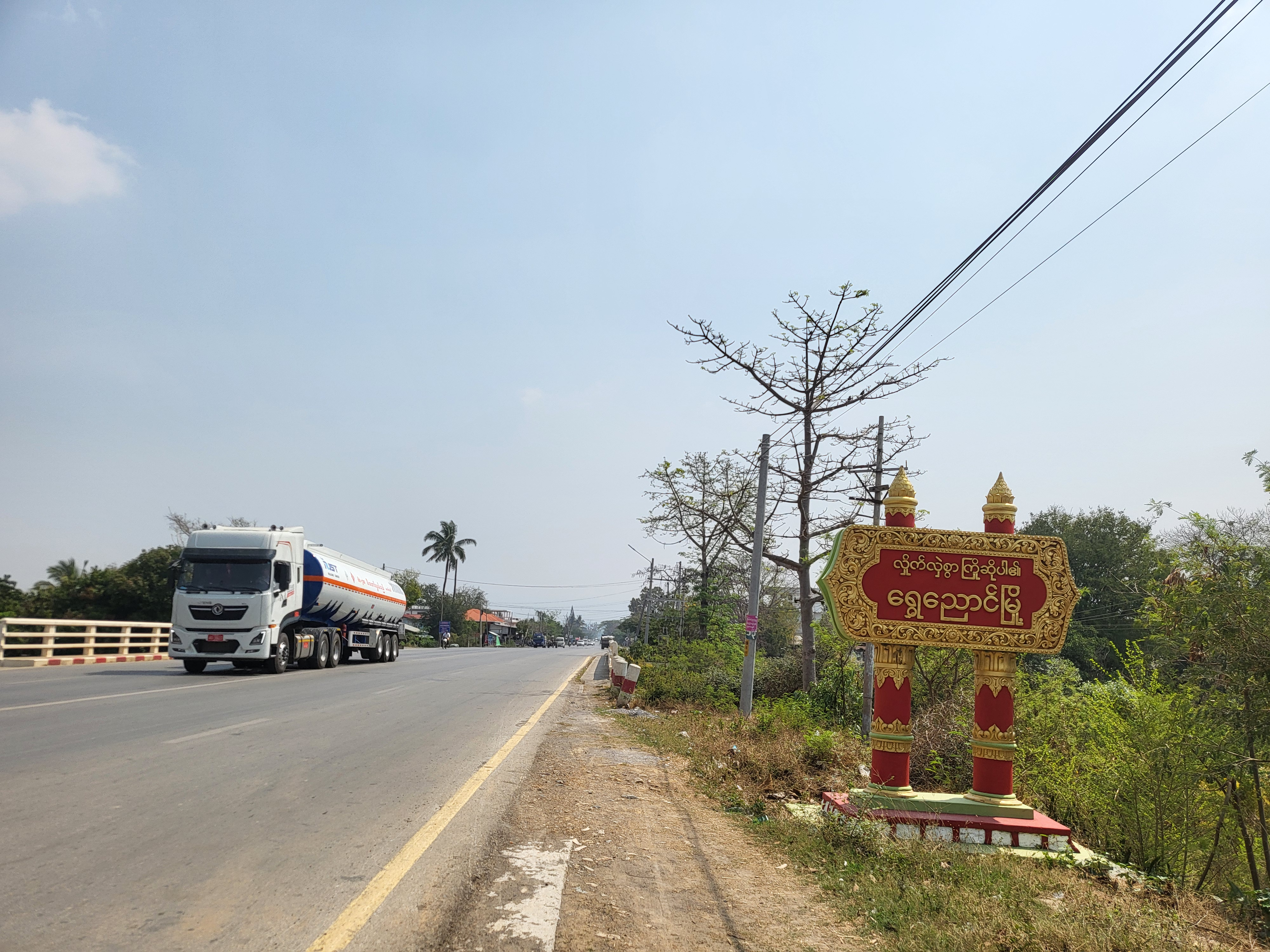

- Location of Shwenyaung, Myanmar
- Coordinates: 20°45′N 96°56′E
- Country: Myanmar
- State: Shan State
- District: Taunggyi District
- Township: Taunggyi Township

Area
  - Total: 11.68 sq mi (30.3 km^{2})

Population (2023)
  - Total: 37,882
  - Density: 3,243/sq mi (1,252/km^{2})
- Time zone: UTC+6.30 (MMT)

Shwe Nyaung is a town located in southern Shan state of Myanmar. The town is near the Shan state capital Taunggyi and about 7 miles north of Nyaungshwe. It lies at the intersection of National Highway 47 and National Highway 43 connecting Taunggyi and Nyaungshwe with Aungban and Nawnghkio. In 2023 it had a population of 37,882 people. The town is divided into 11 urban wards with the most populated being Aung Thabyay with 6,871 people.

It was historically the western terminus of the Shwenyaung–Mongnai Railway connecting south and eastern Shan State to the capital Taunggyi. Shwenyaung serves as a transport hub sitting 1,600 feet (490 m) lower in elevation from Taunggyi. In 1997, the Shwenyaung to Taunggyi portion was finally completed using zig zag railways.

The town is located on the Taryaw stream, which flooded parts of the town in June 2025.
