= Sagyin =

Village in Mandalay Region, Myanmar

Sagyin စကျင် Sakyin
- Village
- Location in Myanmar
- Coordinates: 22°17′40″N 96°04′20″E
- Country: Myanmar
- Region: Mandalay Region
- District: Aungmyethazan District
- Township: Madaya Township

Population (2014)
  - Total: 5,800
  - Ethnicities: Bamar
  - Religions: Theravada Buddhism
- Time zone: UTC+6.30 (MST)

Sagyin (Burmese: စကျင်) is a village in Mandalay Region, Myanmar. The village's name is eponymous with the Burmese word for "marble." Sagyin is home to Myanmar's largest marble quarry, the Sagyin Hills. Burmese white marble is prized for its hardness and texture. The village is home to 5,800 villagers and 2,000 households, 80% of whom work in the local marble industry, including as marble artisans, sculptors and miners. During military rule, Chinese and military-linked companies were granted decades-long licences to mine marble in the village.

Sagyin marble has been used at prominent Buddhist sites, including the main Buddha statue at Konbaung-era Kyauktawgyi Temple in Mandalay, Tripiṭaka tablets at Kuthodaw Pagoda, and the main Buddha statue at Burmese Buddhist Temple in Singapore.
