= Lower Chindwin =

Group of volcanoes in Myanmar

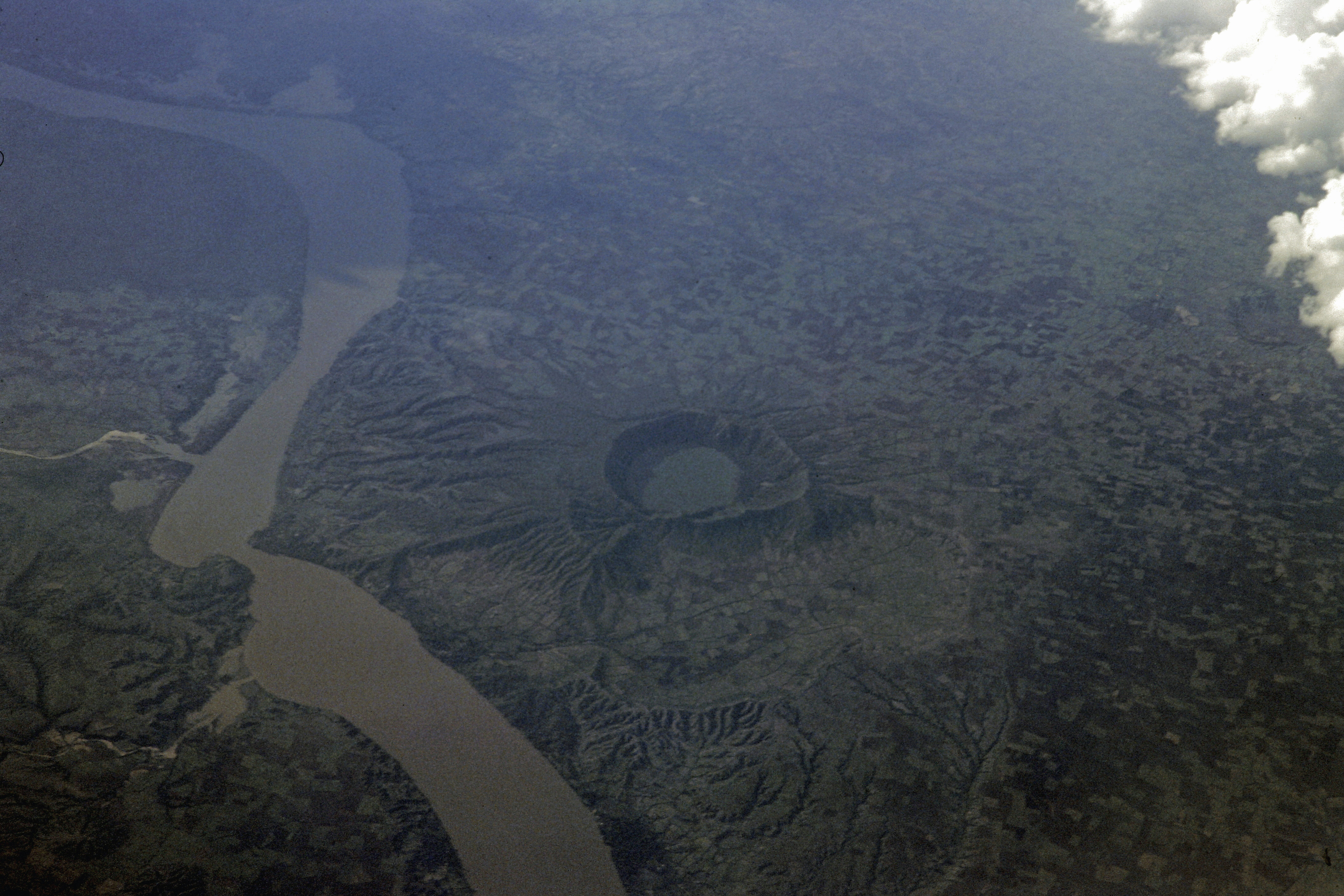
- Aerial view of lower Chindwin River and Twin Taung (1980).

Highest point
- Elevation: 385 m (1,263 ft)
- Listing: List of volcanoes in Burma
- Coordinates: 22°22′14″N 95°1′7″E

Geography
- Location within Myanmar
- Location: Burma

Geology
- Mountain type: Volcanic field
- Last eruption: unknown (> 10.000 years)

The Lower Chindwin is an area of around seven or eight explosion craters, located some 30 km (20 mi) northwest of the town of Monywa in the Sagaing Region, Burma (Myanmar).

The volcanoes originate from the late Pliocene and Pleistocene times. The craters are dormant (Smithsonian volcano number = 275090). In the Global Volcanism Program of the Smithsonian Institution no information on Holocene eruptions, dating back 10,000 years, is listed.

The major rock types of the group are basalt, rhyolite, dacite and andesite.

Three to four craters have lakes, one of which is east of the Chindwin river, the others are to the west. The eastern lake is named Twin Taung (or Twindaung), the others Taung Pyauk, Twyn Ma and Yay Khar. In the lakes the cyanobacteria Spirulina (often called blue-green algae) grows. It is harvested, dried and sold as medicine. At the end of 2014 it was reported that the Government of Myanmar planned to nominate Twin Taung Lake for inclusion on the list of UNESCO World Heritage Sites.
