= List of volcanoes in Myanmar =

This is a list of active and extinct volcanoes in Myanmar (also known as Burma).

== Volcanoes ==
Name	Elevation		Location	Last eruption
Name	meters	feet	Coordinates	Last eruption
Lower Chindwin	385	1263	22.28°N 95.10°E	Holocene
Mount Popa	1518	4980	20.92°N 95.25°E	6050BC
Singu Plateau	507	1663	22.70°N 95.98°E	Holocene
Taungthonton	1680	5512	24.96°N 95.80°E	Unknown
Namyong	508	1668	25.68°N 96.43°E	Pliocene to Pleistocene
