= Patheingyi =

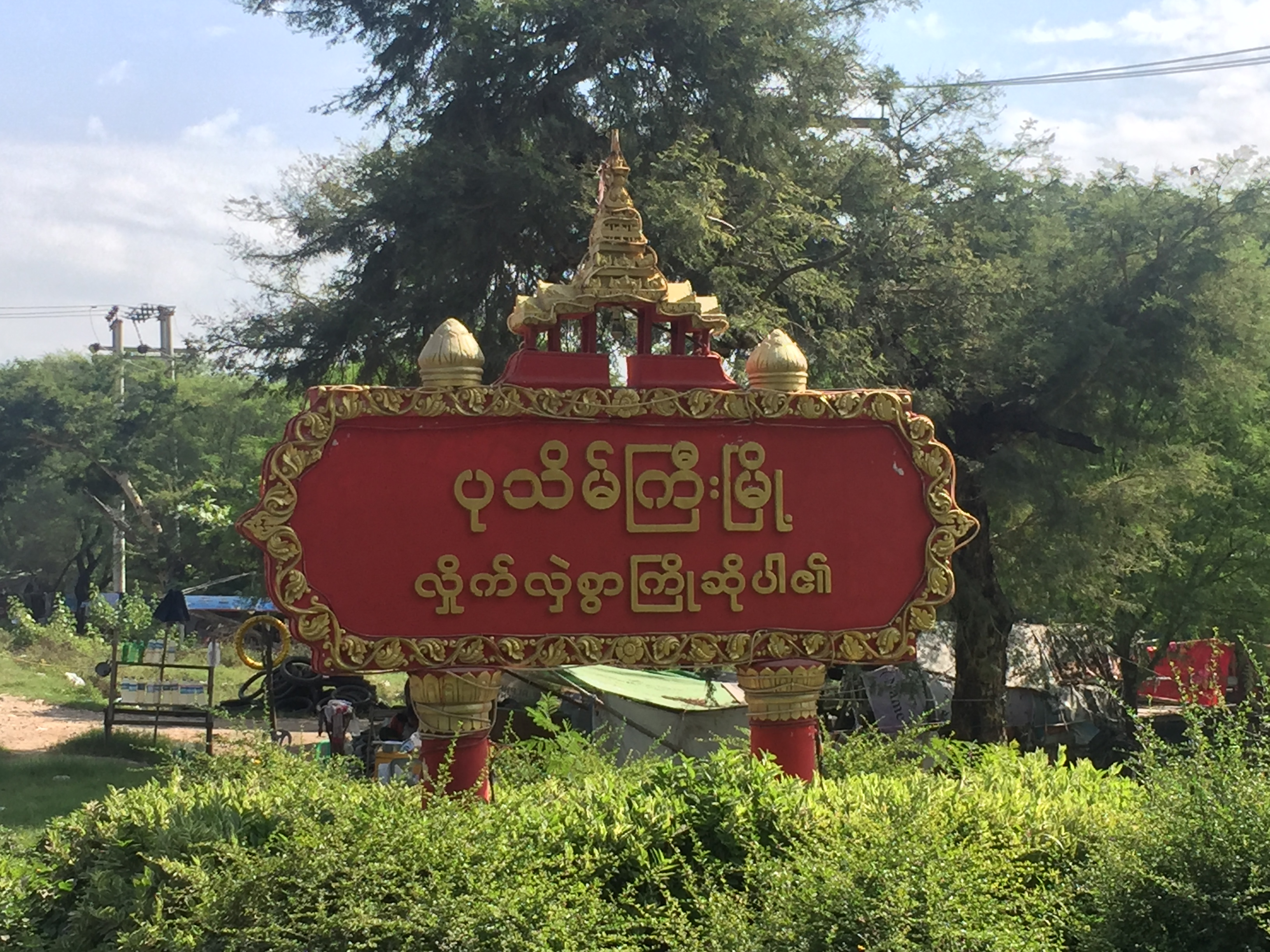

- Location in Burma
- Coordinates: 22°0′N 96°10′E
- Country: Myanmar
- Region: Mandalay Region
- District: Aungmyethazan District
- Township: Patheingyi Township

Population (2005)
  - Religions: Buddhism
- Time zone: UTC+6.30 (MST)

Patheingyi is a town in the Mandalay Region of central Myanmar.
