= Aingdaing =

Aing Daing Aing Daing Aing Daing
- Village and island
- Aing Daing
- Location in Myanmar
- Coordinates: 22°8′1″N 96°1′21″E
- Country: Myanmar
- Region: Mandalay Region
- District: Pyin Oo Lwin District
- Township: Madaya Township
- Time zone: UTC+6.30 (MST)

Aing Daing is a village island in Madaya Township in Pyin Oo Lwin District in the Mandalay Division of central Myanmar. It lies just outside the north west of Mandalay city and on the Ayeyarwady River.
