= National Highway 43 (Myanmar) =

Road in Myanmar

National Highway 43
- အမှတ် 43 ပြည်ထောင်စုလမ်းမကြီး

Route information
- Length: 294.11 km (182.75 mi)

Major junctions
- South end: Mandalay
- North end: Myitkyina

Location
- Country: Myanmar
- Major cities: Tagaung, Bhamo

Highway system
- Transport in Myanmar

National Highway 43 (NH43) is a major highway of central/northeastern Myanmar (formerly Burma). It starts in Mandalay at the rim of the Mandalay Palace area from National Highway 3 at 21°58′59″N 96°5′3″E and ends in Myitkyina in Kachin State at 25°21′1″N 97°26′8″E. The major settlements the road passes through from Mandalay are as follows: Lamaing, Madaya, Tagaung, Bhamo, Myothit, Dawhpumyang, Waingmaw before finally arriving in Myitkyina.
