= Letha Taung =

- Singu Plateau
- Location within Myanmar

Highest point
- Elevation: 493 m (1,617 ft)
- Listing: List of mountains in Burma
- Coordinates: 22°41′N 95°58′E

Geography
- Location: Mandalay Division, Myanmar
- Parent range: Foothills of the Shan Hills

Climbing
- First ascent: unknown
- Easiest route: climb

Letha Taung, also known as the Singu Plateau, is a small volcanic plateau in central Burma (Myanmar).

== Geography ==
Letha Taung is located near Nweyon, Singu Township, Pyinoolwin District, Mandalay Division, about 3 km west of National Highway 31. The lavas that form the plateau originally came from fissure vents during the Holocene, although the date of the last eruption is unknown. The active Sagaing Fault, a transform boundary runs under this structure.

== See also ==
- List of mountains in Burma
- List of volcanoes in Burma
