= Aungmyethazan District =

Aungmyethazan District အောင်မြေသာစံ ခရိုင်
- District
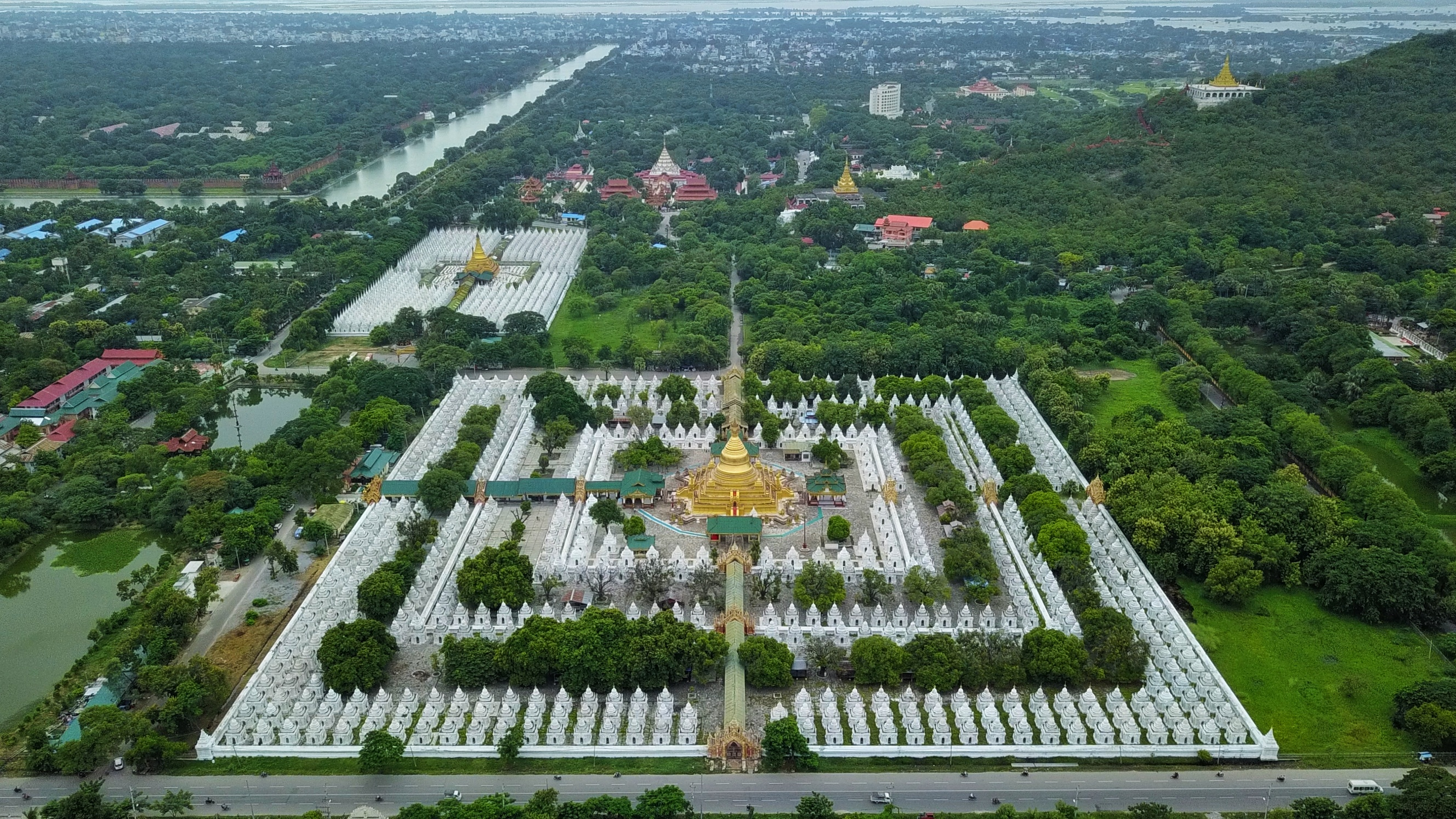
- Culture Zone near Mandalay Hill

- location in Mandalay region

- Location in Burma
- Coordinates: 21°58′0″N 96°05′0″E
- Country: Myanmar
- Region: Mandalay
- Time zone: UTC6:30 (MST)

Aungmyethazan District or Aungmyaythazan District (Burmese: အောင်မြေသာစံခရိုင်) is the district of Mandalay Region, Myanmar. Partly included under Mandalay City Development Committee and Mandalay. Its principal township is Aungmyaythazan.

== Townships ==
Townships of Aungmyethazan District Aungmyethazan Township Patheingyi Township Madaya Township

The townships, cities, towns that are included in Aungmyaythazan District are as follows:

- Aungmyethazan Township (part of Mandalay)
- Patheingyi Township
  - Patheingyi
- Madaya Township
  - Madaya

== History ==
On April 30, 2022, new districts were expanded and organized. Aungmyethazan Township and Patheingyi Township from Mandalay District and Madaya Township from Pyinoolwin District were formed as Aungmyethazan District. This district is part of the Mandalay metropolitan area.
