= Thabeikkyin Township =

Thabeikkyin Township သပိတ်ကျင်းမြို့နယ် Tha Pate Kyin Township
- Township
- Location in Pyinoolwin district

- Location within Myanmar
- Coordinates: 22°53′N 95°59′E
- Country: Myanmar
- Division: Mandalay Region
- District: Thabeikkyin District
- Capital: Thabeikkyin
- Time zone: UTC+6:30 (MMT)

Thabeikkyin Township (Burmese: သပိတ်ကျင်းမြို့နယ်, Tha Pate Kyin Township) is a township of Thabeikkyin District in the Mandalay Region of Burma. It is the northernmost township in Mandalay Region and, although it primarily lies on the east bank (left bank) of the Irrawaddy, it has a small enclave on the western bank extending as far as the village of Gagalaw, near the town of Baw in Katha District, Sagaing Region. On the south it borders Singu Township, on the east, Mogote Township and further north Shan State, while it abuts Tigyaing Township of Sagaing Region to the north.
