= Thabeikkyin =

Thabeikkyin သပိတ်ကျင်းမြို့
- Town
- Location in Burma
- Coordinates: 22°53′0″N 95°58′25″E
- Country: Myanmar
- Region: Mandalay Region
- District: Thabeikkyin District
- Township: Thabeikkyin Township

Population (2005)
  - Religions: Buddhism
- Time zone: UTC+6.30 (MST)

Thabeikkyin (Burmese: သပိတ်ကျင်းမြို့) is a town in the Mandalay Region of central Myanmar. It is alleged by the Democratic Voice of Burma that a secret nuclear facility is located there.

== See also ==
- Thabeikkyin District
