= Kyauktawgyi Buddha Temple (Mandalay) =

Buddhist temple in Mandalay, Myanmar

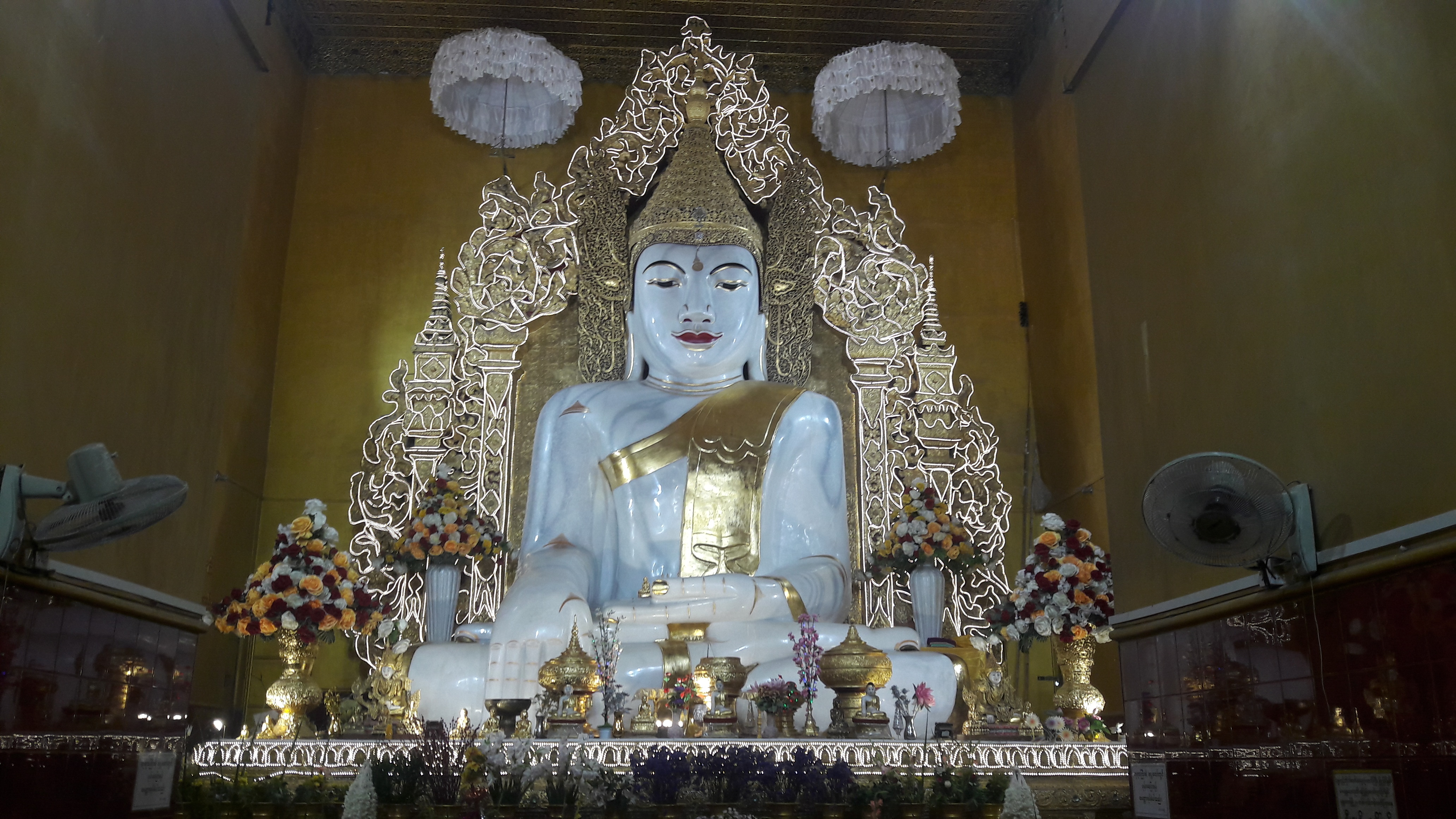

- Location within Myanmar

Religion
- Affiliation: Buddhism
- Sect: Theravada Buddhism

Location
- Location: Mandalay
- Country: Myanmar
- Interactive map of Kyauktawgyi Buddha Temple
- Coordinates: 22.004474°N 96.106582°E

Architecture
- Founder: Mindon Min
- Completed: 1878; 148 years ago
- Materials: Sagyin marble

Kyauktawgyi Buddha Temple (Burmese: ကျောက်တော်ကြီးဘုရား; also known as the Great Marble Image) is a well-known Buddhist temple located near the southern entry to Mandalay Hill, Myanmar, opposite the northeastern corner of the Mandalay moat. The image of the Buddha is officially known as Maha Thetkya Mayazein (Burmese: မဟာသကျမာရဇိန်; Pali: Mahāsakyamārajina).

Construction began in 1853 under the patronage of King Mindon Min, but the site was not completed until 1878 because of internal discord in the mid-1860s, including a palace rebellion. The temple was initially modelled after the Ananda Temple in Bagan, but the completed temple does not resemble the former.

The Kyauktawgyi Buddha is a huge sculpted image of the Buddha seated in the Bhūmipassa Mudrā (ဘူဖဿမုဒြာ). The figure was sculpted from a single block of pale green marble quarried at Sagyin, 12 miles (19 km) north of Mandalay. The stone block was transported over the course of 13 days, requiring the manpower of 10,000 to 12,000 men, to the temple site, where it was carved. The image was consecrated in 1865.

A pagoda festival is annually held at Kyauktawgyi Buddha Temple in October.
