= Nawnghkio =

Nawnghkio ဝဵင်းၼွင်ၶဵဝ် နောင်ချိုမြို့
- Town
- Naung Cho
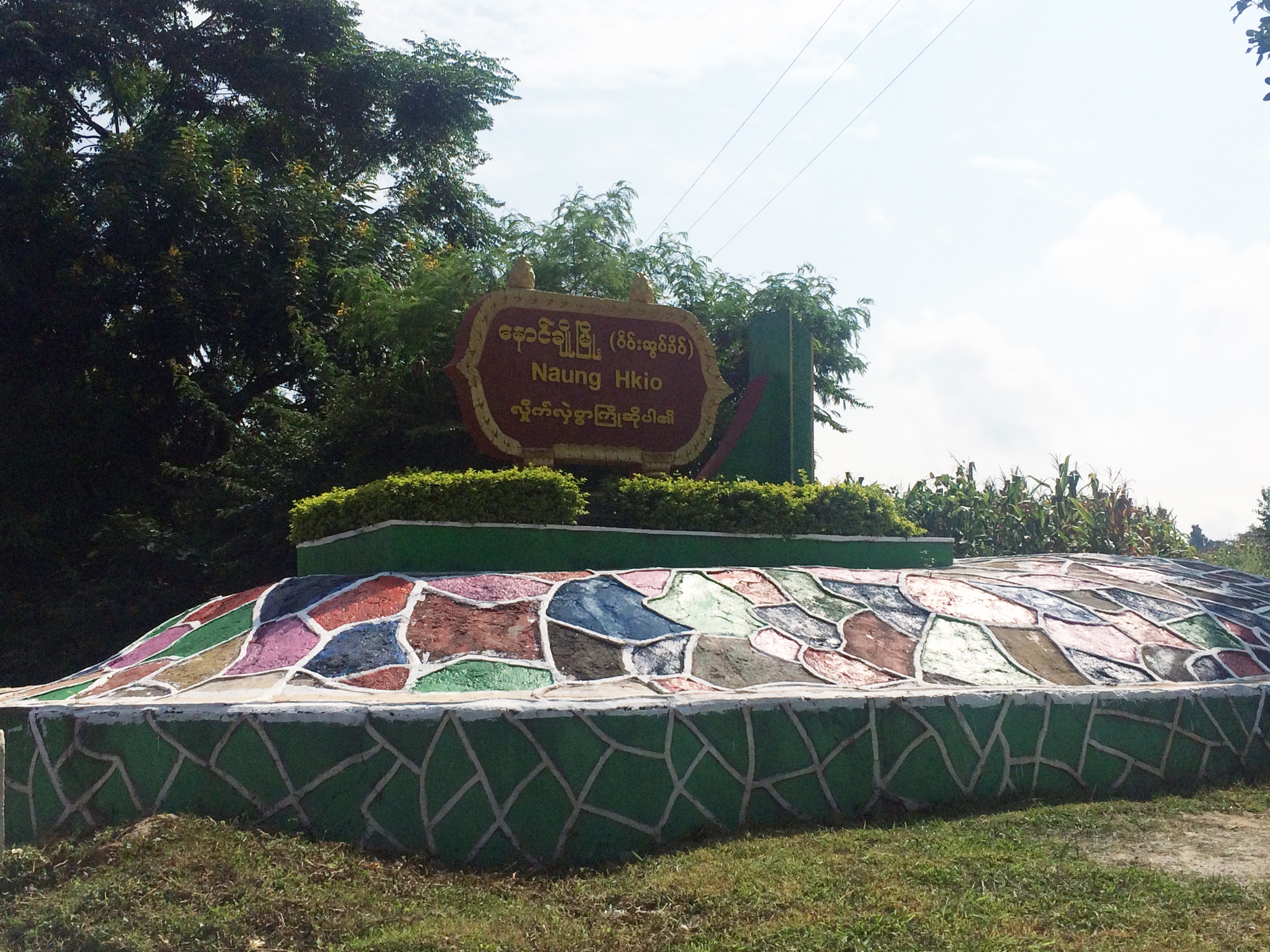

- Location in Burma
- Coordinates: 22°19′N 96°48′E
- Country: Myanmar
- State: Shan State
- District: Kyaukme District
- Township: Nawnghkio Township

Population (2019)
  - Total: 16,274
  - Ethnicities: Shan Bamar
  - Religions: Buddhism
- Time zone: UTC+6.30 (MST)

Nawnghkio (Burmese: နောင်ချိုမြို့, Shan: ဝဵင်းၼွင်ၶဵဝ်), variously spelt Naunghkio, Naungcho or Nawngcho, is a town in Kyaukme District, in northern Shan State, Myanmar (formerly Burma). It is the principal town and administrative seat of Nawnghkio Township. It is connected to Mandalay, Pyin U Lwin, Kyaukme, Hsipaw and Lashio by road and rail and by road to Taunggyi via National Road 43. Asia World Company won the contract to rebuild part of the road in 2002. Originally on the Mandalay-Lashio Road, after Pyin U Lwin and before Kyaukme, Nawnghkio is on what is now the Mandalay-Muse Road, part of the Asian Highway Route 14 (AH14).

Approximately 2,900 acres (12 km^{2}) of land in the area were reclaimed and allotted to coffee growers in 1999–2000.

Women of reproductive age (15-49) in Kyaukme and Nawnghkio have been targeted for improvement in reproductive health in the community in collaboration with Japan. A study mission was started in June 2004, with the project continuing for the period January 2005- December 2009.

The town was seized by the Ta'ang National Liberation Army during fighting in June 2024 in the course of Myanmar's civil war. The Tatmadaw recaptured the town on 16 July 2025.
