= Pyinoolwin Township =

Pyinoolwin Township Maymyo Township
- Township
- Location in Pyinoolwin District

- Location within Myanmar
- Coordinates: 21°59′N 96°34′E
- Country: Myanmar
- Division: Mandalay Region
- District: Pyin Oo Lwin District
- Capital: Pyin U Lwin
- Time zone: UTC+6:30 (MMT)

Pyinoolwin Township (Pyin U Lwin Township, Maymyo Township) is a township in Pyinoolwin District, Mandalay Region of Myanmar. The administrative seat is Pyin U Lwin.

== Towns and villages ==
Pyinoolwin Township includes the following towns and villages:

- Anisakan (Aneesakan)
- Kyuntapin
- Pyintha
- Thinkadon
- Thon-daung-ywa-ma
- Wetwin (Watwon)
- Zeygon
- Holeik/""holeik, maymyo, burma"
