= Banyin =

Coordinates: 20.46031°N 97.23592°E

Bayin is a village in Shan State, Taunggyi District, Hsi Hseng Township. This village has a police station, a hospital, and a high school. There are two armies, numbers 425 and 426 which are located in the front of the village. They are built on the slope of small mountains.

== Transport ==
It is served by a station on Myanmar Railways. Other transportation is carried by highway expresses.

== See also ==
- Transport in Myanmar
