= Mogok =

City in Mandalay Region, Myanmar

Mogok မိုးကုတ် Mogoke
- City
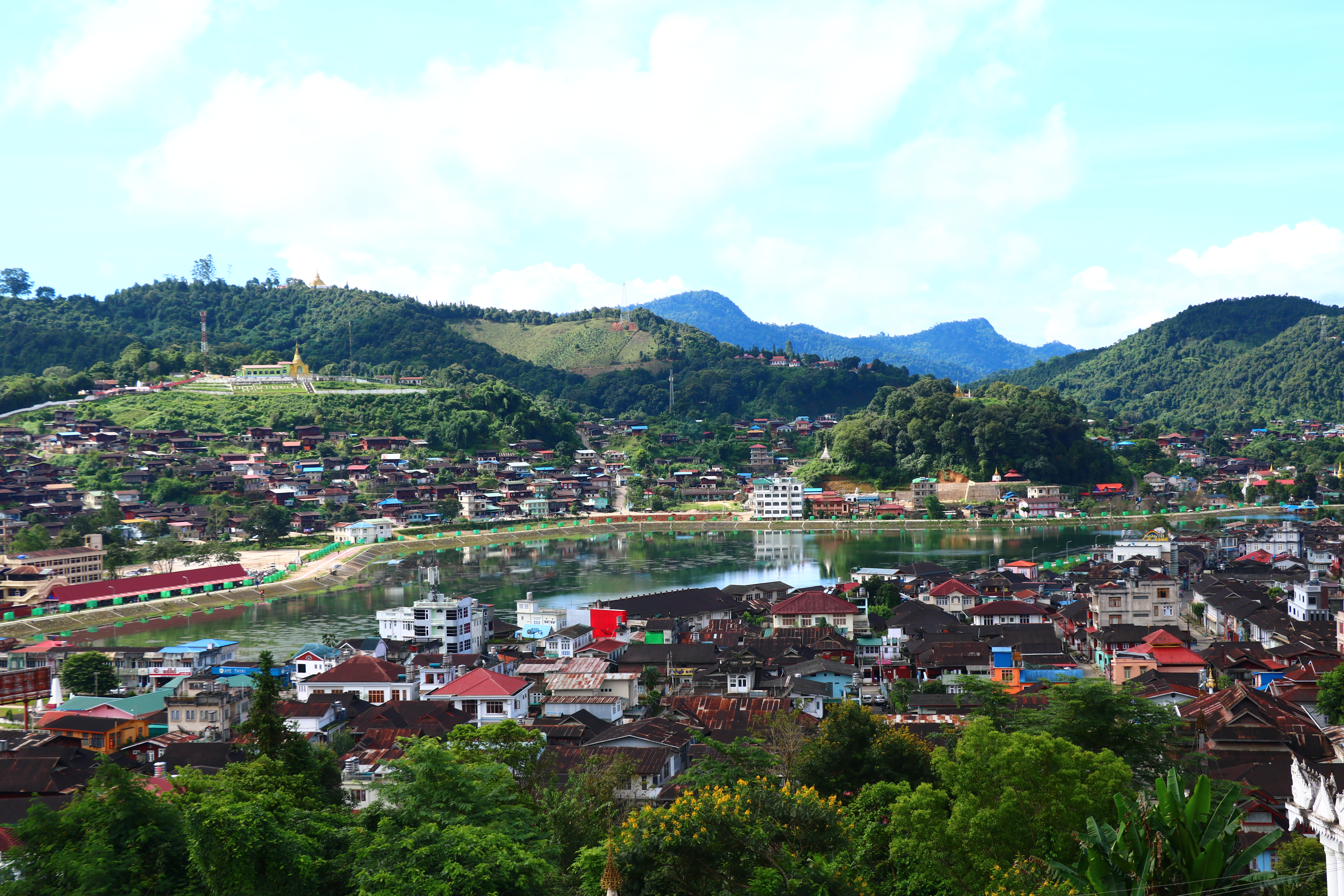

- Location of Mandalay, Burma
- Coordinates: 22°55′N 96°30′E
- Country: Myanmar
- Region: Mandalay Region
- District: Thabeikkyin
- Township: Mogok

Area
  - Total: 12.48 sq mi (32.3 km^{2})

Population (2019)
  - Total: 89,855
  - Density: 7,200/sq mi (2,780/km^{2})
  - Religions: Buddhism
- Time zone: UTC+6.30 (MMT)

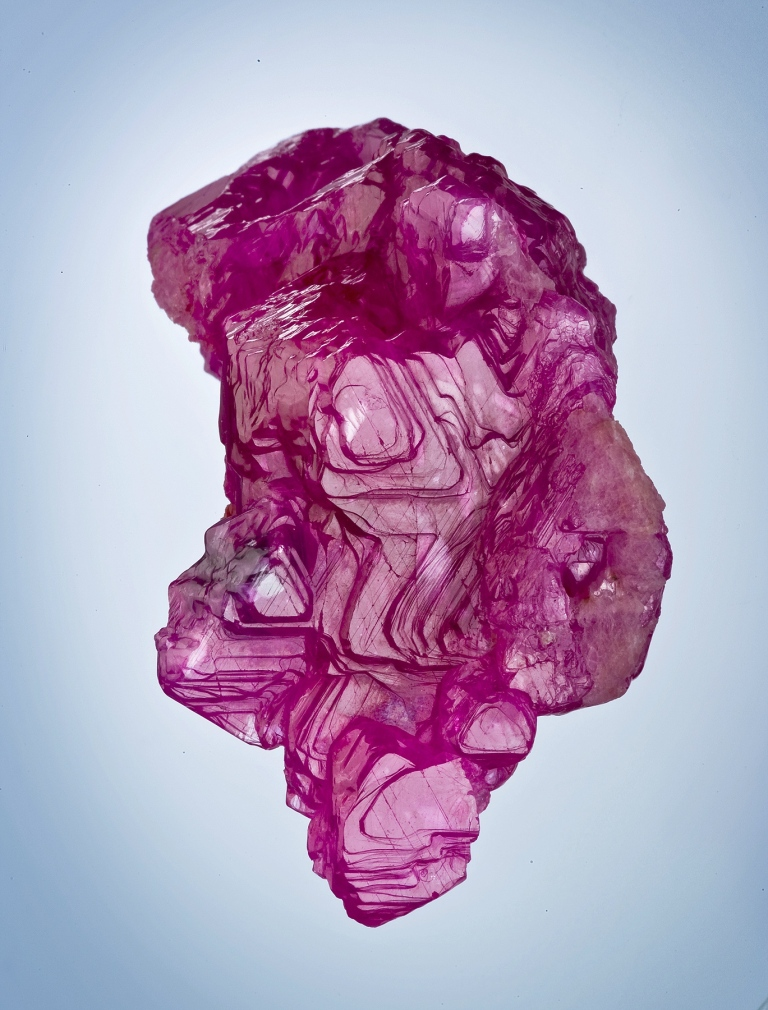
Large ruby (corundum) crystal from Mogok. Size: 5.5 × 3.2 × 3 cm. Myanmar's mines account for perhaps 90% of ruby production

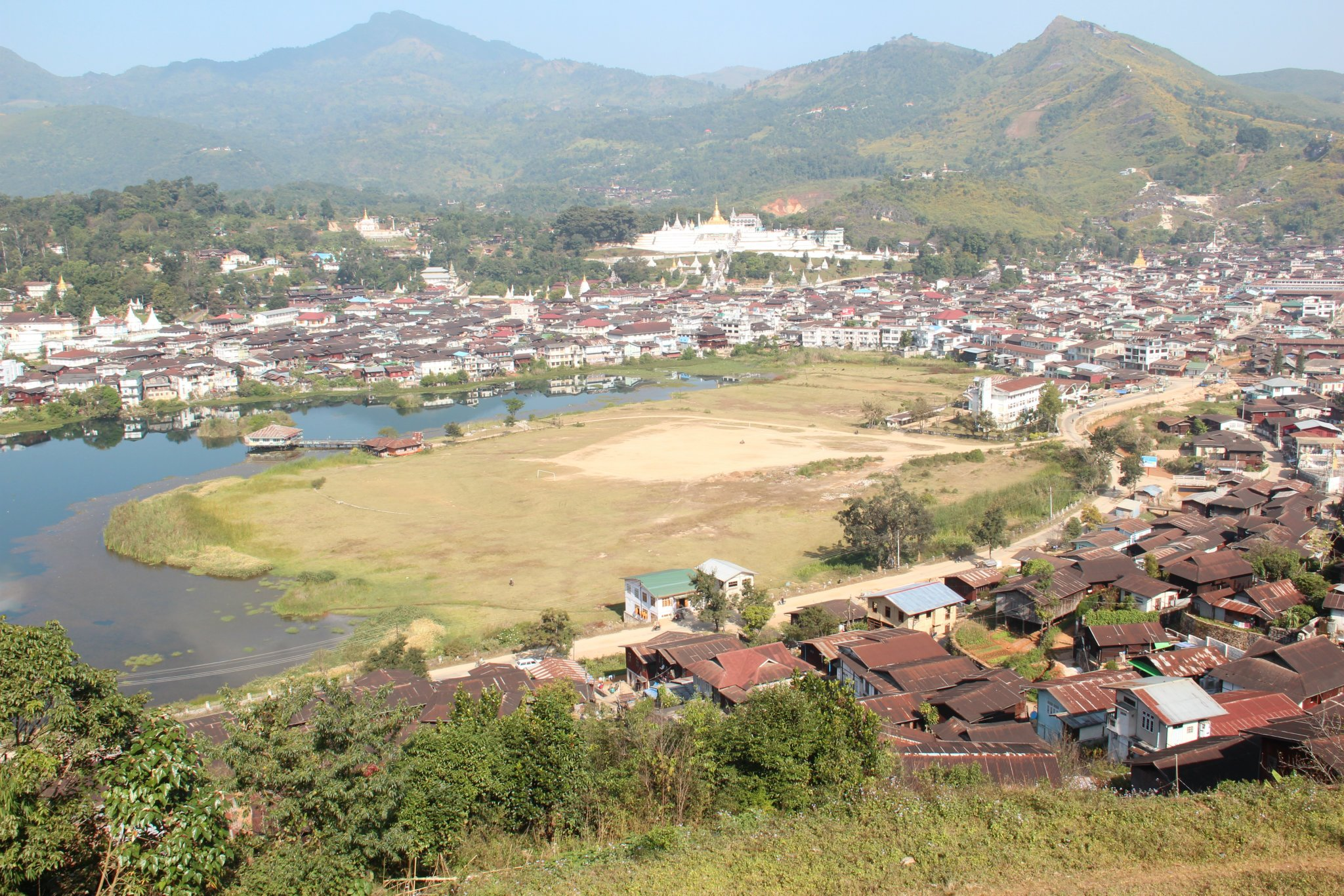
Mogok City

Mogok (Burmese: မိုးကုတ်မြို့, MLCTS: mui: kut mrui., [móɡoʊʔ]; Shan: မိူင်းၵုတ်ႈ, Möng Kut [mɤ́ŋ kut]) is a Mandalay Region major city of around 90,000 people in the Thabeikkyin District of Mandalay Region of Myanmar, located 200 kilometres (120 mi) north of Mandalay and 148 kilometres (92 mi) north-east of Shwebo.

== Etymology ==
Mogok is derived from the Shan language name "Möng Kut" (Shan: မိူင်းၵုတ်ႈ), meaning "winding valley".

== History ==
Mogok is believed to be founded in 1217 by three lost Shan hunters who discovered rubies at the base of a collapsed mountain later known as Kyee Arr Taung. According to the oral history, the hunters returned to their home in Momeik and offered the precious stones to the local saopha who established a village in what would become modern-day Mogok.

Following the 1885 Third Anglo-Burmese War when the British conquered and annexed the hither to independent Upper Burma, in 1886 the British launched a military expedition to "open up" the ruby mines at Mogok and make them available to British merchants. George Skelton Streeter, a gem expert and son of Edmund Streeter of the Streeters & Co Ltd jewellery company in London, accompanied the expedition and stayed there to work as a government valuer in British-run mines.

In 2018, the Mogok commemorated the 800th anniversary of the city's founding.

During the Myanmar civil war, the town was the site of large-scale fighting between the Ta'ang National Liberation Army and Myanmar's military, with large eastern portions of the town falling under rebel control. The town fell to armed ethnic rebel forces on 24 July 2024. The TNLA withdrew from Mogok after a China-brokered ceasefire on 29 October 2025.

== Geography ==
At 1,170 metres (3,840 ft) in elevation, the city has a fairly temperate climate year-round, and is home to Bamar, Shan, Lisu, Palaung, and Karen ethnic groups, as well as Chinese, Indians and Gurkhas. The city is composed of two towns, Mogok and Kyat Pyin. Mogok is four miles long and two miles wide. It is situated in a valley surrounded by a large number of mountains. Taung Min Taung mountain is the highest mountain in the region and is at an elevation of more than 7000 feet. Kyatpyin lies about 7 miles (11 km) southwest of Mogok. Tourists who travel to this area need a special authorization and a guide person.

=== Climate ===
In contrast to the hot to sweltering, semi-arid Dry Zone, Mogok has a borderline humid subtropical climate (Köppen Cwa) and a subtropical highland climate (Cwb) characterised by a warm dry season with cold mornings from mid-November to mid-April, and a very warm and extremely rainy wet season akin to that of Kachin State, only less extreme in heat discomfort, from mid-April to mid-November. The annual rainfall of around 2,700 millimetres or 106 inches is comparable to that of Yangon and three times that of Mandalay.

Climate data for Mogok, elevation 1,176 m (3,858 ft), (1991–2020)
Month	Jan	Feb	Mar	Apr	May	Jun	Jul	Aug	Sep	Oct	Nov	Dec	Year
Mean daily maximum °C (°F)	23.2 (73.8)	25.5 (77.9)	28.5 (83.3)	29.4 (84.9)	27.8 (82.0)	25.8 (78.4)	24.9 (76.8)	25.3 (77.5)	26.5 (79.7)	26.5 (79.7)	25.6 (78.1)	23.3 (73.9)	26.0 (78.8)
Daily mean °C (°F)	14.4 (57.9)	16.5 (61.7)	20.0 (68.0)	22.4 (72.3)	23.1 (73.6)	22.8 (73.0)	22.4 (72.3)	22.5 (72.5)	22.8 (73.0)	21.5 (70.7)	18.6 (65.5)	15.4 (59.7)	20.2 (68.4)
Mean daily minimum °C (°F)	5.7 (42.3)	7.6 (45.7)	11.4 (52.5)	15.4 (59.7)	18.3 (64.9)	19.9 (67.8)	19.9 (67.8)	19.7 (67.5)	19.0 (66.2)	16.4 (61.5)	11.7 (53.1)	7.4 (45.3)	14.4 (57.9)
Average precipitation mm (inches)	12.9 (0.51)	10.7 (0.42)	19.5 (0.77)	76.1 (3.00)	352.7 (13.89)	510.4 (20.09)	475.1 (18.70)	482.2 (18.98)	349.7 (13.77)	287.5 (11.32)	69.8 (2.75)	14.7 (0.58)	2,661.4 (104.78)
Average precipitation days (≥ 1.0 mm)	1.1	1.4	2.6	7.7	18.9	25.7	27.4	28.0	23.0	16.8	4.6	1.7	158.9
Source: World Meteorological Organization

== Economy ==
Mogok and other villages nearby, especially Kyatpyin have been famous since ancient times for its gemstones, especially ruby and sapphire, but semi-precious stones such as spinel, lapis lazuli, garnet, moonstone, peridot and chrysoberyl are also found. The gems are found in alluvial marble gravels by means of panning, tunneling and digging pits by hand. There is little mechanization of the mining. The gravels derive from the metamorphosed limestones (marbles) of the Mogok metamorphic belt.

Gems are sold in markets in Mogok; however, foreigners require special permits to visit the town, and it is illegal to purchase/export gems from Myanmar other than from government licensed dealers.

90% of a certain version of the world's rubies come from Myanmar (Burma). There are many other ruby sources in the world such as Sri Lanka and various places in Africa. Only in terms of quality Mogok rubies are the best. The red stones from there are prized for their purity and hue. Thailand buys the majority of Myanmar's gems. The "Valley of Rubies", the mountainous Mogok area, 200 km (120 mi) north of Mandalay, is noted as the original source of ruby including the world's finest "pigeon's blood" rubies as well as one of the world's most beautiful sapphires in "royal" blue, only second to the now extinct Kashmir blue.

== Health care ==
- Mogok General Hospital
- Kyatpyin General hospital

== Notable people ==
- Htet Htet Moe Oo
- Htun Eaindra Bo
- N Kai Ra, singer
- Phway Phway
- Wutt Hmone Shwe Yi
- Autar Singh Paintal
