= Madaya, Myanmar =

Madaya (Myanmar) မတ္တရာ
- Town
- Location in Burma
- Coordinates: 22°12′37.4″N 96°06′45.3″E
- Country: Myanmar
- Division: Mandalay Region
- District: Aungmyethazan District
- Township: Madaya Township
- Time zone: UTC+6.30 (MST)

Madaya is a town in the Mandalay Region of central Myanmar. It is the seat of Madaya Township. It lies along National Highway 31 (Mandalay-Myitkyina Road). Lamaing lies just to the south-east. The Madaya River in the area is connected to the Mandalay Canal, and crosses the township of Madaya diagonally for some 30 miles and joins the Irrawaddy River.

== History ==
In the 16th century, the Gwe Shans built a stockade in the village of Okpo. On October 1, 1886, there was a reported small native garrison at Madaya and nearby Lamaing and the town was subject to invasion the same month.
