= Mogok Township =

Mogok Township မိုးကုတ် မြို့နယ်
- Township
- Location in Pyinoolwin district

- Location within Myanmar
- Coordinates: 22°55′N 96°30′E
- Country: Myanmar
- Region: Mandalay Region
- District: Thabeikkyin District
- Capital: Mogok

Area
  - Total: 453.6 sq mi (1,175 km^{2})
- Elevation: 3,858 ft (1,176 m)

Population (2019)
  - Total: 185,893
  - Density: 409.8/sq mi (158.2/km^{2})
- Time zone: UTC+6:30 (MMT)

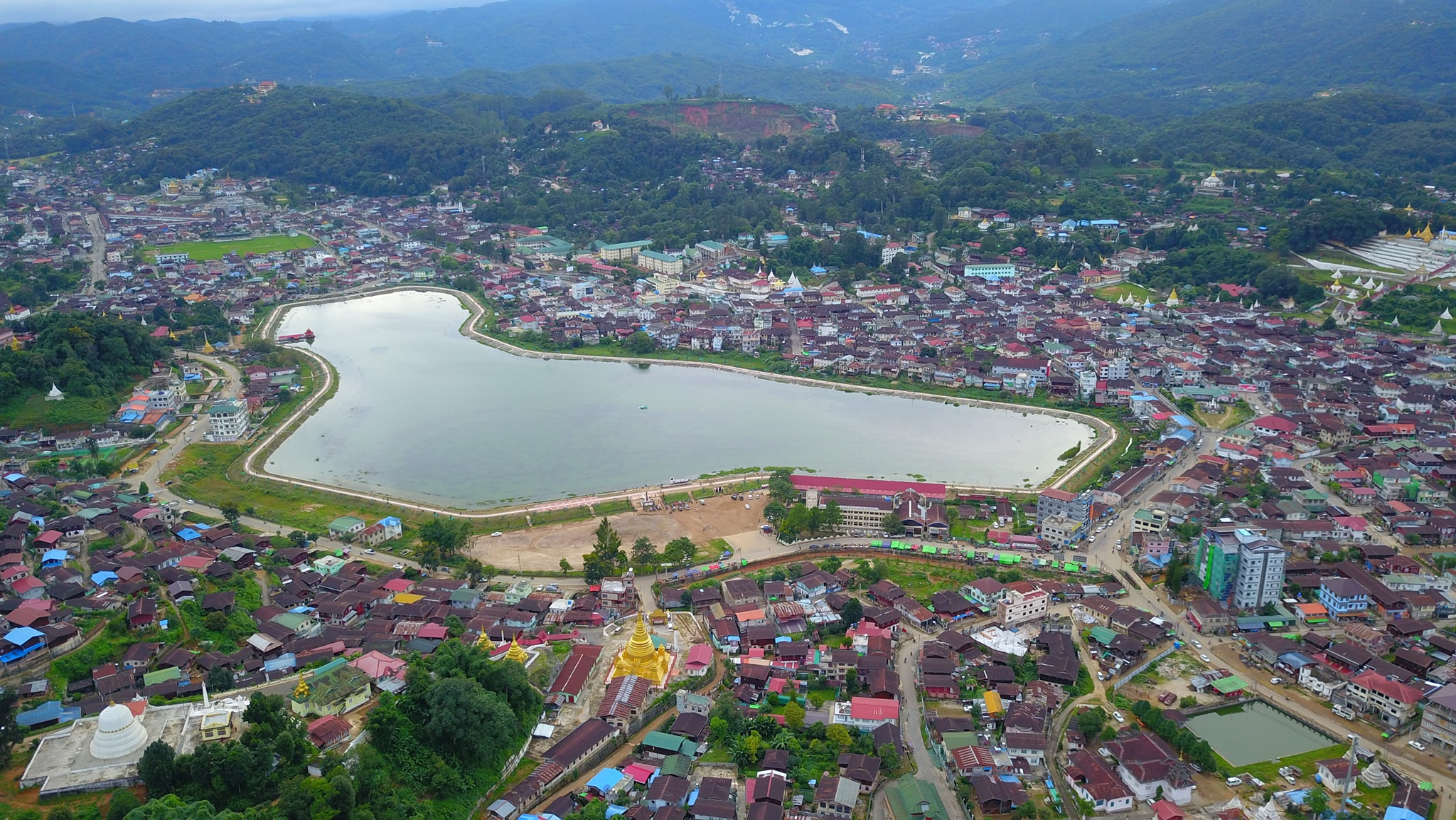
Mogok Lake View

Mogok Township (also spelled as Mogoke Township) is a township of Thabeikkyin District in Mandalay Region, Burma (Myanmar). It is located north of the city of Mandalay and surrounds the town of Mogok.

== Demographics ==
=== 2014 ===
Historical Population
Year	Pop.	±%
1973		—
1983		—
2014	167,149	—
Source: Ministry of Labor, Immigration, and Population data

The 2014 Myanmar Census reported that Mogok Township had a population of 167,149. The population density was 142.3 people per km^{2}. The census reported that the median age was 26.7 years, and 103 males per 100 females. There were 35,247 households; the mean household size was 4.5.

=== Mogok People's Defence Force ===
The Mogok People's Defence Force of the National Unity Government, established after the 2021 Myanmar coup d'état, is based in Mogok Township, and is a participant in the ongoing Operation 1027 against the military government of Myanmar.
