= Madaya Township =

Madaya Township မတ္တရာမြို့နယ်
- Township
- Location in Aungmyethazan district

- Location within Myanmar
- Coordinates: 22°13′N 96°7′E
- Country: Myanmar
- Region: Mandalay
- District: Aungmyethazan
- Capital: Madaya
- Time zone: UTC+6:30 (MMT)

Madaya (Burmese: မတ္တရာမြို့နယ်) is a township of Aungmyethazan District in the Mandalay Region of Myanmar.

Taungbyone Festival of nat (spirit) takes place in the township in August yearly. The township is also home to Myanmar's largest marble quarry in Sagyin.

== History ==
In the 16th century, the Gwe Shans built a stockade in the village of Okpo. On October 1, 1886, there was a reported small native garrison at Madaya and nearby Lamaing and the town was subject to invasion the same month.

== Villages ==
Madaya consists Madaya town and the following villages:

- Aingdaing
- Dingagyun
- Mayogon
- Sagyin
- Shwebaung
- Sinywagale
- Tainggaing
- Taungbyon
- Thapandaung
- Powa (North)
- Mwe Pon Kan

Taking Lyon Hein Taung
