= National Highway 31 (Myanmar) =

Road in Myanmar

National Highway 31
- အမှတ် 31 ပြည်ထောင်စုလမ်းမကြီး
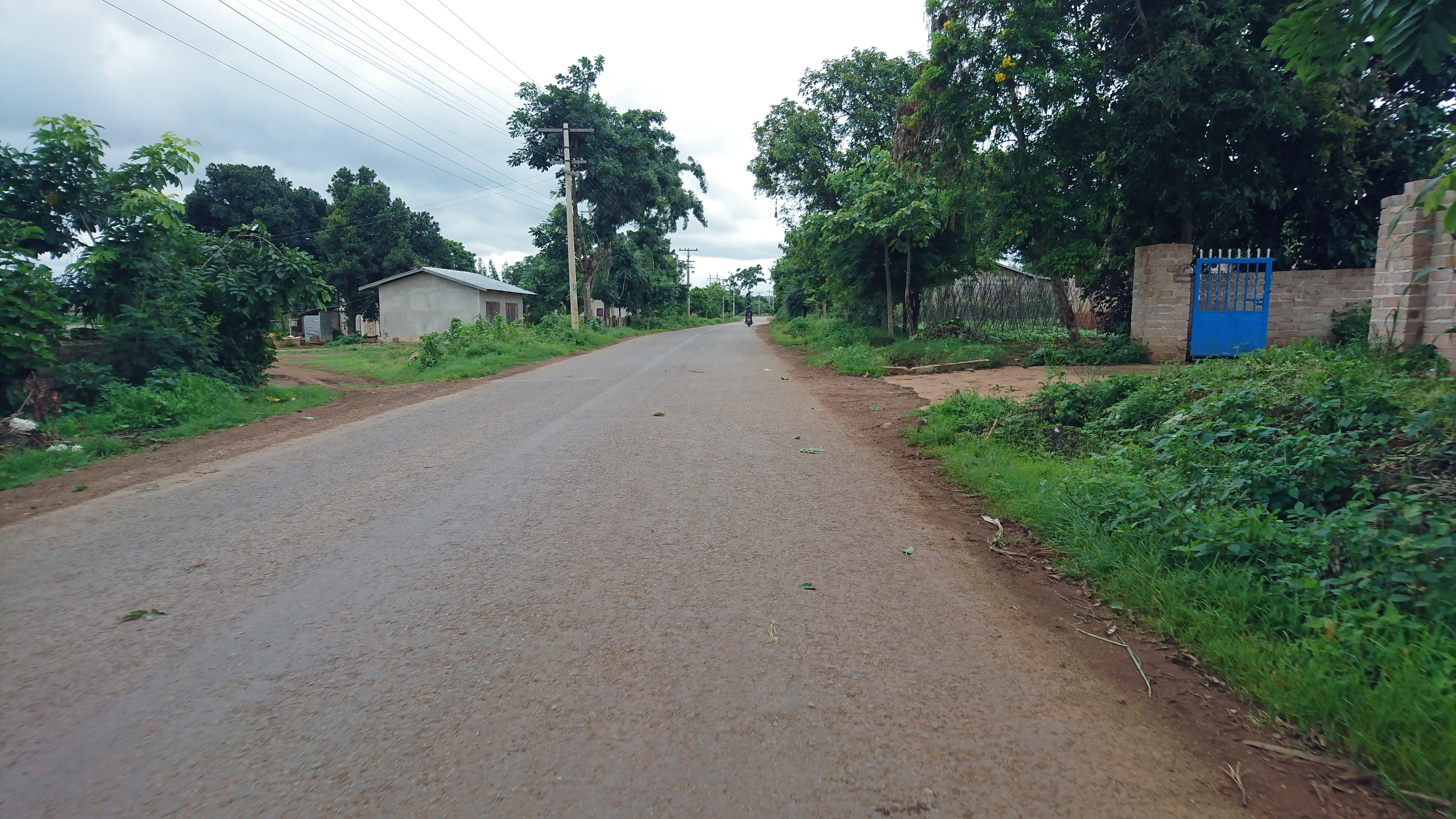

Route information
- Length: 231.64 km (143.93 mi)

Major junctions
- South end: Shwenyaung
- North end: Nawnghkio

Location
- Country: Myanmar
- Major cities: Shwenyaung, Lawksawk, Nawnghkio

Highway system
- Transport in Myanmar

National Highway 31 (NH31) is a highway of eastern Myanmar, passing through Shan State. The 231.6-km highway connects the National Highway 37 at Nawnghkio at 22°19′41″N 96°48′10″E with National Highway 27 at Sakangyi at 20°45′41″N 96°56′42″E in the south, several miles west of the city of Taunggyi.
