= Singu Township =

- Township
- Location in Thabeikkyin district

- Location within Myanmar
- Coordinates: 21°34′5″N 96°26′3″E
- Country: Myanmar
- Division: Mandalay Region
- District: Thabeikkyin District
- Capital: Singu

Population (2014)
  - Total: 157,585
- Time zone: UTC+6:30 (MMT)

Singu (Burmese: စဉ့်ကူးမြို့နယ်) is a township of Thabeikkyin District, Mandalay Division, Myanmar. The capital is Singu.

== Geography ==
Singu Township is located between the Irrawaddy River on the west and the Shan Hills on the east. Among the main hills located in the township are Bodaw-taung and Ngwe-o-baw. Average yearly rainfall is between about 63.5 and 76 cm.

== History ==
In 1901, Singu Township was part of Madaya district, with its southern border defined by the Chaung-ma-gyi stream. Its northern border was with the Ruby Mines district. The township's estimated population at that point was about 45,000 people. About 60% of the population was employed in agriculture, primarily growing rice and several varieties of millet. The township was self-sufficient in rice production, except in years with poor rainfall. Fishing was also an important economic activity, employing "many hundreds" of people. Fish caught in the Irrawaddy and its tributary streams were exported to Madaya, Mandalay, and Shwebo. Ngapi was also manufactured and exported to the Shan States and to the Ruby Mines district. In the Sagyin hills, where high-quality alabaster was extracted, there was also a small sculpture industry; most of the sculptures produced were exported to Mandalay.
