= Pyin Oo Lwin District =

Pyin Oo Lwin District ပြင်‌ဦးလွင်‌ခရိုင်
- District
- Map of Pyin Oo Lwin District after 2022

- Location in Myanmar
- Coordinates: 22°02′N 96°27′E
- Country: Myanmar
- Region: Mandalay Region
- Capital: Pyin U Lwin (Maymyo)
- Time zone: UTC+6.30 (MMT)

Pyin Oo Lwin District (Burmese: ပြင်‌ဦးလွင်‌ခရိုင်, MLCTS: MLCTS) is a district of the Mandalay Region in central Myanmar. It lies northeast of Mandalay, and consists solely of Pyin Oo Lwin Township.

Prior to 2022, it contained five townships with the Myitnge River as its southern boundary. To the east it is bordered by Shan State and in part by the Chaung Magyi (Chaung means stream). It goes north as far as the town of Dakaung where it adjoins Htigyaing Township, Katha District in Sagaing Region. Its western boundary, is for the most part the Irrawaddy, but a very small portion of Thabeikkyin Township is west of the Irrawaddy, near the town of Baw in Sagaing Region. To the southwest it borders Mandalay District.

== Townships ==
The district formerly contained the following townships:

- Pyinoolwin Township (Maymyo Township)
- Madaya Township (Matayar Township)
- Singu Township (Sint Ku Township)
- Thabeikkyin Township (Tha Pate Kyin Township)
- Mogok Township (Mogote Township)

On 30 April 2022, Madaya Township was put into the new Aungmyethazan District, while Singu, Thabeikkyin and Mogok were put into the new Thabeikkyin District.
