= Miss Universe Myanmar 2019 =

2019 beauty pageant in Myanmar

- Date: May 31, 2019
- Presenters: Kyaw Htet Aung
- Venue: Novotel Max Hotel, Yangon, Myanmar
- Broadcaster: MRTV Entertainment
- Entrants: 26
- Placements: 13
- Debuts: Thaton; Yangon (East)
- Withdrawals: Bagan; Bago; Kalay; Keng Tung; Kyaukse; Loikaw; Meikhtila; Mohnyin; Pyin Oo Lwin; Sittwe
- Returns: Lashio; Monywa; Muse
- Winner: (Kayin State) Hpa-An; Swe Zin Htet
- Best National Costume: (Sagaing Region) Monywa; Mi Mi Zin
- Photogenic: (Tanintharyi Region) Myeik; Hmwe Thet

Miss Universe Myanmar 2019 was the 7th Miss Universe Myanmar pageant held on 31 May 2019 at Novotel Max Hotel, Yangon, Myanmar. Hnin Thway Yu Aung, Miss Universe Myanmar 2018 of Bago crowned Swe Zin Htet of Hpa-An her successor at the end of the event.The winner represented Myanmar at Miss Universe 2019 in Tyler Perry Studios, Atlanta, Georgia, United States but unplaced.

== Results ==
Color keys

- The contestant Won in an International pageant.
- The contestant was a Runner-up in an International pageant.
- The contestant was a Semi-Finalist in an International pageant.
- The contestant assumed another title.
- The contestant was not able to compete in an International pageant.
- The contestant did not place but won a Special Award in the pageant.
- The contestant did not place.

Final Results	Contestant	International Placement
Miss Universe Myanmar 2019	(Kayin State) Hpa-an – Swe Zin Htet	Unplaced - Miss Universe 2019
1st Runner-Up	(Tanintharyi Region) Myeik – Hmwe Thet	Unplaced - Miss Grand International 2019
2nd Runner-Up	(Mandalay Region) Mandalay – Htet Thiri Zaw	Unplaced - Miss Intercontinental 2019
3rd Runner-Up	(Magway Region) Minbu – Htun Pearl Yadanar	Top 20 - Face of Beauty International 2018
4th Runner Up	(Kachin State) Myitkyina – Linn Htet Htet Kyaw	Top 13 - World Beauty Queen 2019
5th Runner Up	Pathein – Su Su Sandy	
Top 13	(Tanintharyi Region) Dawei – Nilar; (Kachin State) Hpakant – Ah Lum Put (Htu Seng); (Mon State) Mawlamyine - Kyawt Kyawt Khine; (Shan State) Muse – Mary Htang Htang; (Kayin State) Myawaddy – Thae Nandar Su; Naypyitaw – Pan Pan Angelic; (Yangon Region) Yangon (West) – No Noe K	

== Awards ==
=== Special awards ===
Award	Contestant
Miss Famous	(Kachin State) Myitkyina – Linn Htet Htet Kyaw
Miss Photogenic	(Tanintharyi Region) Myeik – Hmwe Thet
Miss Healthy Skin	(Yangon Region) Yangon (West) – No Noe K
Miss Best Swimsuit	(Kayin State) Hpa-an – Swe Zin Htet
People Choice Award	(Shan State) Taunggyi – Thattant Shwe Yi Nann

=== Best in Talent ===
Award	Contestant
Winner	(Yangon Region) Yangon (West) – No Noe K
1st Runner-up	(Kayin State) Myawaddy – Thae Nandar Su
2nd Runner-up	(Bago Region) Taungoo – Kay Kay Phyo

=== Best National Costume ===
Award	Contestant
Winner	(Sagaing Region) Monywa – Mi Mi Zin
Top 5	(Kayin State) Hpa-an – Swe Zin Htet; (Shan State) Muse – Mary Htang Htang; Pathein – Su Su Sandy; (Shan State) Tachileik – Su Lurb Nwe
People Choice Award	(Shan State) Taunggyi – Thattant Shwe Yi Nann

== Pageant ==
=== Judges ===
- U Ye Myat Thu
- Sharr Htut Eaindra – Miss Universe Myanmar 2014
- May Barani Thaw – Miss Universe Myanmar 2015
- Absent
- Maung Myo Min – Director
- Moe Set Wine – Miss Universe Myanmar 2013
- Min That San – Fashion Designer

== Contestants ==
Official 26 Finalists of Miss Universe Myanmar 2019:

No.	Candidates	Age (Note: Ages at the time of the pageant)	Height	Hometown	Placement	Special awards
1	Nilar	22	5'6"	(Tanintharyi Region) Dawei	Top 13	
2	Swe Zin Htet	20	5'9"	(Kayin State) Hpa-an	Miss Universe Myanmar 2019	Miss Best Swimsuit; Top 5 - Best National Costumes
3	Ah Lum Put (Htu Seng)	24	5'6"	(Kachin State) Hpakant	Top 13	
4	Yoon Eaindra Ko	25	5'6"	(Shan State) Lashio		
5	Kyi Zin Theint	21	5'6"	(Magway Region) Magway		
6	Htet Thiri Zaw	19	5'8"	(Mandalay Region) Mandalay	2nd Runner Up (Miss Intercontinental Myanmar 2019)	
7	Kyawt Kyawt Khine	23	5'8"	(Mon State) Mawlamyine	Top 13	
8	Htun Pearl Yadanar	21	5’5”	(Magway Region) Minbu	3rd Runner Up (Face of Beauty Myanmar 2019)	
9	Thet Htar Khin	21	5'8"	(Mandalay Region) Mogok		
10	Mi Mi Zin	25	5'6"	(Sagaing Region) Monywa		Best National Costumes
11	Mary Htang Htang	21	5'7"	(Shan State) Muse	Top 13	Top 5 - Best National Costumes
12	Thae Nandar Su	21	5'6"	(Kayin State) Myawaddy	Top 13	1st Runner-up - Best Talent Awards
13	Hmwe Thet	26	5'8"	(Tanintharyi Region) Myeik	1st Runner Up (Miss Grand Myanmar 2019)	Miss Photogenic
14	Lin Htet Htet Kyaw	20	5'6"	(Kachin State) Myitkyina	4th Runner Up (World Beauty Queen Myanmar 2019)	Miss Famous
15	Pan Pan Angelic	22	5'5"	Naypyitaw	Top 13	
16	Su Su Sandy	22	5'5"	(Ayeyarwady Region) Pathein	5th Runner Up	Top 5 - Best National Costumes
17	Thu Thet Hsu Nyunt	25	5'8"	(Bago Region) Pyay		
18	Moe Bwe Ko Ko	20	5'8"	(Sagaing Region) Sagaing		
19	Su Lurb Nwe	19	5'7"	(Shan State) Tachileik		Top 5 - Best National Costumes
20	Thattant Shwe Yi Nann	26	5'4"	(Shan State) Taunggyi		People Choice Award - Best National Costume
21	Kay Kay Phyo	20	5'5"	(Bago Region) Taungoo		2nd Runner-up - Best Talent Awards
22	May Myint Mo Kyaw	23	5'6"	(Mon State) Thaton		
23	Kha Kha San	18	5'9"	(Yangon Region) Yangon (East)		
24	Mya Myint Zu Thant	22	5'7"	(Yangon Region) Yangon (North)		
25	Kyi Lei Aung	20	5'4"	(Yangon Region) Yangon (South)		
26	No Noe K	26	5'7"	(Yangon Region) Yangon (West)	Top 13	Best Talent Awards

== Notes ==
=== Debuts ===
- (Mon State) Thaton
- (Yangon Region) Yangon (East)

=== Withdrawals ===
- (Sagaing Region) Kalay
- (Mandalay Region) Kyaukse
- (Kachin State) Mohnyin
- (Mandalay Region) Meikhtila
- (Rakhine State) Sittwe

=== Returns ===
Last competed in 2017:

- (Shan State) Lashio
- (Sagaing Region) Monywa
- (Shan State) Muse

=== Did not compete ===
- (Mandalay Region) Bagan - Nang Khaing Zin Win not competing due to her father health.
- (Bago Region) Bago - Yamin Myat Chel not competing due to her personal injury.
- (Shan State) Keng Tung - Nang July Htun not competing due to undisclosed reasons.
- (Kayah State) Loikaw - Julius Nadi Tun not competing due to her personal injury.
- (Mandalay Region) Pyin Oo Lwin - Kay Thwe not competing due to undisclosed reasons.

=== Replacements ===
- (Tanintharyi Region) Dawei - Khin Sabal Moe Hlaing was replaced by Nilar the first runner-up of Miss Universe Dawei 2018 because the original winner, Khin Sabal being unable to attend the pageant.
- (Kayin State) Myawaddy - Chit Su Ngal was replaced by Thae Nanda Su the first runner-up of Miss Universe Myawaddy 2018 for undisclosed reasons.
- (Bago Region) Taungoo - Khin Yamone Tinn was replaced by Kay Kay Phyo, the first runner-up of Miss Universe Taungoo 2018 due to Khin Yamone, had to withdraw due to a personal injury.
- Yangon (East) - Emerald Nyein was replaced by Kha Kha San, the finalist of Miss Universe Myanmar 2018 because the original winner, Emerald Nyein being unable to attend the pageant.

=== Designations ===
- (Magway Region) Minbu - Htun Pearl Yadanar was appointed as Miss Universe Minbu 2018.
- (Mandalay Region) Mogok - Thet Htar Khin was appointed as Miss Universe Mogok 2018.
- (Shan State) Tachileik - Su Lub Nwe was appointed as Miss Universe Tachileik 2018.
