= Miss Universe Myanmar =

Annual beauty pageant competition in Myanmar

- မယ်စကြဝဠာမြန်မာ
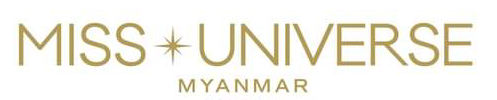
- Formation: 2025
- Type: Beauty pageant
- Headquarters: Yangon
- Location: Myanmar
- Members: Miss Universe; Miss World; Miss Cosmo; Miss International; Miss Charm; Miss Global
- Official language: Burmese
- National Director: Mr. Soe Min Tun

Miss Universe Myanmar (Burmese: မယ်စကြဝဠာ မြန်မာ) is an annual national beauty pageant that selects Myanmar's representative to the annual Miss Universe contest.

The reigning Miss Universe Myanmar is May Grace Parry of Hpa-An, who was crowned on June 17, 2026, in Yangon. She will represent Myanmar at Miss Universe 2026, to be held in San Juan, Puerto Rico in November 2026.

== History ==
The Miss Universe Myanmar Organization was founded in 2013 by National Director Soe Yu Wai, and its first competition was held on 3 October 2013 at the National Theatre in Yangon. Moe Set Wine became the first woman to represent Myanmar at Miss Universe since 1961, marking a historic return to the international stage.

From 2013 to 2025, Myanmar competed under Soe Yu Wai’s leadership, only one placement was achieved in 2021.

In 2026, The Miss Universe Myanmar franchise for 2026 was taken over by Mr. Soe Min Tun, founder of the Mingalarpar Miss Myanmar Organization and former national director of Miss Grand Myanmar.Titleholders

The following is a list of all Miss Universe Myanmar titleholders, and runners-up, from its inception in 2013.

Year	Edition	Date	Miss Universe Myanmar	Runners up					Final venue	Host City	Entrants
Year	Edition	Date	Miss Universe Myanmar	First	Second	Third	Fourth	Fifth	Final venue	Host City	Entrants
Miss Universe Myanmar under Ms. Soe Yu Wai
2013	1st	3 October	Moe Set Wine (Yangon Region) Yangon	Aye Chan Moe (Yangon Region) Yangon	Myat Hnin Phyu (Mon State) Mawlamyine	Hnin Yamone Oo (Tanintharyi Region) Kawthaung	May Chit Pone (Yangon Region) Yangon	Not awarded	National Theatre of Yangon	Yangon	20
2014	2nd	26 July	Sharr Htut Eaindra (Yangon Region) Yangon	Yoon Mhi Mhi Kyaw (Mandalay Region) Mandalay	Shwe Sin Ko Ko (Mon State) Mawlamyine	Not awarded	Not awarded	Not awarded	National Theatre of Yangon	Yangon	20
2015	3rd	26 July 2015	May Barani Thaw (Yangon Region) Yangon	Han Lay (Mandalay Region) Mandalay	Cho Cho Tun (Rakhine State) Sittwe	Ei Phyo Thwe † (Mon State) Mawlamyine	Not awarded	Not awarded	Gandamar Grand Ballroom	Yangon	20
2016	3rd	26 July 2015	Htet Htet Htun (Yangon Region) Yangon	Han Lay (Mandalay Region) Mandalay	Cho Cho Tun (Rakhine State) Sittwe	Ei Phyo Thwe † (Mon State) Mawlamyine	Not awarded	Not awarded	Gandamar Grand Ballroom	Yangon	20
2017	4th	6 October 2016	Zun Than Sin (Yangon Region) Yangon	Shwe Eain Si (Yangon Region) Yangon	Ja Dim Kai (Kachin State) Myitkyina	Thun Wadi (Shan State) Lashio	Khin La Pyae Zaw (Yangon Region) Yangon	Not awarded	Novotel Hotels and Resorts	Yangon	26
2018	5th	30 September 2017	Hnin Thway Yu Aung (Bago Region) Bago	Su Myat Phoo; Naypyidaw	Nang Mway Phoung Loong (Shan State) Tachileik	Myint Mo May (Kayin State) Hpa-An	Roslynn Seng Nu Nu Pai (Kachin State) Myitkyina	Not awarded	Gandamar Grand Ballroom, Gandamar Wholesale	Yangon	30
2019	6th	31 May	Swe Zin Htet (Kayin State) Hpa-An	Hmwe Thet (Tanintharyi Region) Myeik	Htet Thiri Zaw (Mandalay Region) Mandalay	Htun Palal Yadanar (Magway Region) Minbu	Linn Htet Htet Kyaw (Kachin State) Myitkyina	Su Su Sandy; Pathein	Novotel Max Hotel	Yangon	26
2020	7th	30 December	Thuzar Wint Lwin (Chin State) Hakha	Han Lay (Kayin State) Myawaddy	May Thazin Oo (Kachin State) Myitkyina	Racheal (Yangon Region) South Yangon	Mya San Thidar; Pathein	Naw Christine (Kachin State) Bhamo	Novotel Max Hotel	Yangon	36
2021	No competition held due to the COVID-19 pandemic										
2022	9th	1 October	Zar Li Moe (Kachin State) Bhamo	Ya Mone (Resigned) (Yangon Region) Yangon	Thinzar Min Htet (Sagaing Region) Shwebo	Poe Myat Hay Thar (Yangon Region) Yangon	Kay Zin Khant (Yangon Region) Yangon	Not awarded	Grand Ballroom, Novotel Hotel	Yangon	14
2023	10th	14 September	Amara Bo (Shan State) Keng Tung	Dee Myo Sandar Win (Mon State) Mawlamyine	Kaymar Budathoki (Kachin State) Bhamo	Nang Nandar Lin (Shan State) Tachileik	No No May (Ayeyarwady Region) Pathein	Thin Sandar (Mandalay Region) Pyin Oo Lwin	Novotel Hotel Max	Yangon	32
2024	11th	7 June	Thet San Andersen (Yangon Region) North Yangon	Cherry Moe (Mandalay Region) Meiktila	Han Lay (Yangon Region) Yangon South	Eaint Myat Chal (Mon State) Mawlamyine	Thaw Dar Sun (Bago Region) Taungoo	Mary Htoi Ra (Kachin State) Myitkyina	Yangon Convention Centre	Yangon	52
2025	12th	27 June	Myat Yadanar Soe (Mandalay Region) Pyin Oo Lwin	Nan Inzali (Chin State) Hakha	Khine Swe Zin Thinn (Rakhine State) Sittwe	Zuly Wint Htal (Mandalay Region) Meiktila	Myo Ko Ko San (Mandalay Region) Mogok	Mary Ja Doi Awng (Kachin State) Myitkyina	Myanmar Expo	Yangon	35
Miss Universe Myanmar under Mr. Soe Min Tun
2026	13th	17 June	May Grace Parry (Kayin State) Hpa-An	Han Theint Theint Aung (Bago Region) Taungoo	Kyaw Kyaw Eaindra (Yangon Region) Yangon West	Saw La Pyae Won (Rakhine State) Sittwe	Shwe Chue Ngone (Yangon Region) Yangon South	Poe Pandra (Bago Region) Bago	Hexagon Complex, Yangon	Yangon	38

=== Winners by City/Town ===
Hometown	Titles	Winning Years
(Yangon Region) Yangon	5	2013, 2014, 2015, 2016, 2017
(Kayin State) Hpa-An	2	2019, 2026
(Mandalay Region) Pyin Oo Lwin	1	2025
(Yangon Region) Yangon North	1	2024
(Shan State) Keng Tung	1	2023
(Kachin State) Bhamo	1	2022
(Chin State) Hakha	1	2020
(Bago Region) Bago	1	2018

== International placements ==
Current Franchises(Under Mr.Soe Min Tun)
Membership	Year
Big Four international beauty pageant:
Miss Universe	2026 – Present
Miss World	2025 – Present
Miss International	2025 – Present
Minor international beauty pageant:
Miss Cosmo	2024 – Present
Miss Global	2026 – Present
Miss Charm	2026 – Present
Former Franchises
Membership	Year
Big Four international beauty pageant:
Miss Earth	2019 – 2021
Minor international beauty pageant:
Miss Grand International	2021 – 2024
Miss Planet International	2024
Miss Teen International	2024
Miss Celebrity International	2024

Past Franchises(Under Soe Yu Wai)
Membership	Year
Big Four international beauty pageant:
Miss Universe	2013 – 2025
Miss Earth	2024
Minor international beauty pageant:
Miss Grand International	2017 – 2020
World Beauty Queen	2017 – 2019
Miss Intercontinental	2018 – 2019
Miss Face Of Beauty International	2019 – 2025
Miss Charm	2021
Miss Supranational	2024 – 2025

=== Current franchise ===
Color keys

- : Declared as Winner
- : Ended as Runner-up or Top 5
- : Ended as one of the Finalists
- : Ended as one of the Semi-finalists
- : Ended as Unplaced and have special awards

==== Miss Universe Myanmar ====
- The winner of Miss Universe Myanmar represents her country at the Miss Universe. On occasion, when the winner does not qualify (due to age) for either contest, a runner-up is sent.
- Thuzar Wint Lwin has the highest placement as she placed Top 21 at Miss Universe 2020.

Year	Hometown	Representative's Name	Title	Placement	Special Awards
2026	(Kayin State) Hpa-An	May Grace Parry	Miss Universe Myanmar 2026	TBA	
2025	(Mandalay Region) Pyin Oo Lwin	Myat Yadanar Soe	Miss Universe Myanmar 2025	Unplaced	
2024	(Yangon Region) North Yangon	Thet San Andersen	Miss Universe Myanmar 2024	Unplaced	
2023	(Shan State) Keng Tung	Amara Bo	Miss Universe Myanmar 2023	Unplaced	
2022	(Kachin State) Bhamo	Zar Li Moe	Miss Universe Myanmar 2022	Unplaced	
2021	Did not compete				
2020	(Chin State) Hakha	Thuzar Wint Lwin	Miss Universe Myanmar 2020	Top 21	1 Special Awards: Best National Costume
2019	(Kayin State) Hpa-An	Swe Zin Htet	Miss Universe Myanmar 2019	Unplaced	
2018	(Bago Region) Bago	Hnin Thway Yu Aung	Miss Universe Myanmar 2018	Unplaced	
2017	(Yangon Region) Yangon	Zun Than Sin	Miss Universe Myanmar 2017	Unplaced	
2016	(Yangon Region) Yangon	Htet Htet Htun	Miss Universe Myanmar 2016	Unplaced	1 Special Awards: Best National Costume
2015	(Yangon Region) Yangon	May Barani Thaw	Miss Universe Myanmar 2015	Unplaced	
2014	(Yangon Region) Yangon	Sharr Htut Eaindra	Miss Universe Myanmar 2014	Unplaced	
2013	(Yangon Region) Yangon	Moe Set Wine	Miss Universe Myanmar 2013	Unplaced	
Miss Burma (1947-1962)
1961	(Bago Region) Daik-U	Khin Myint Myint †	Miss Burma 1961	Unplaced	
1960	(Yangon) Rangoon	Myint Myint May	Miss Burma 1960	Unplaced	1 Special Awards: Miss Congeniality
1959	(Yangon) Rangoon	Than Than Aye	Miss Burma 1959	Unplaced	

==== Miss International Myanmar ====
Year	Hometown	Representative's Name	Title	Placement	Special Awards
2025	(Chin State) Hakha	Nann Inzali	Appointed (Former 1st runner up of Miss Universe Myanmar 2025)	Top 10	3 Special Awards: * Miss Popularity; Asia Pacific Top Vote; Top 10 - Best National Costume
2026	(Rakhine State) Sittwe	Saw La Pyae Won	Appointed (3rd runner up of Miss Universe Myanmar 2026)	TBA	TBA

==== Miss World Myanmar ====
Year	Hometown	Representative's Name	Title	Placement	Special Awards
2025	Yangon	Khisa Khin	Miss World Myanmar	Unplaced	Talent Challenge (Top 48)
2026	(Bago Region) Taungoo	Han Theint Theint Aung	Appointed (1st runner up of Miss Universe Myanmar 2026)	Unplaced	Top Model Challenge (Top 60)

==== Miss Global Myanmar ====
Year	Hometown	Representative's Name	Title	Placement	Special Awards
2026	(Yangon Region) Yangon West	Kyaw Kyaw Eaindra	Appointed (2nd runner up of Miss Universe Myanmar 2026)	4th Runner-Up of Miss Global 2026	3 Special Awards: * Best Evening Gown; Best Intro Video; V Square Clinic - Global Icon

==== Miss Cosmo Myanmar ====
Miss Cosmo Myanmar

Year	Hometown	Representative's Name	Title	Placement	Special Awards
2025	(Mon State) Mudon	Myint Myat Moe	Appointed (1st runner up of Miss Grand Myanmar 2024)	Top 5 of Miss Cosmo 2025	3 Special Awards: * Cosmo Social Ambassador Award; Top 5 - Best In Swimsuit; Top 10 - Cosmo People Choice Award
2026	(Bago Region) Taungoo	Thae Su Nyein	Appointed (Miss Grand Myanmar 2024)	TBA	

==== Miss Charm Myanmar ====
Year	Hometown	Representative's Name	Title	Placement	Special Awards
2024	(Kachin State) Myitkyina	Mary Htoi Ra	5th runner-up Miss Universe Myanmar 2020	Did Not Compete	
2023	(Kachin State) Myitkyina	May Thazin Oo	2nd runner-up Miss Universe Myanmar 2020	Unplaced	

== Past franchise ==
=== Face of Beauty Myanmar ===
Face Of Beauty International

Year	Hometown	Representative's Name	Title	Placement	Special Awards
2025	(Chin State) Hakha	Han May Myat Yoon	Miss Universe Hakha 2023	Top 10	1 Special Awards: * Best In Resort Wear
2024	(Kayin State) Hpa-an	Yin May Hnin	Top-10 Miss Universe Myanmar 2024	Unplaced	
2023	(Yangon Region) Yangon	Kendra Erika	3rd Runner-up of Miss Universe Myanmar 2022	Face of Beauty International 2023	1 Special Awards: * Best National Costume
2020-22	Due to the impact of COVID-19 pandemic, no pageant from 2020 to 2022				
2019	(Magway Region) Minbu	Htun Palal Yadanar	3rd Runner-up of Miss Universe Myanmar 2019	Top 20 Semi-finalists	1 Special Awards: * Misosologist's Choice Award
2018	(Kayin State) Hpa-An	Myint Mo May	3rd Runner-up of Miss Universe Myanmar 2018	Face of Beauty International 2018	2 Special Awards: * People's Choice award; 2nd runner-up Best National Costume

=== Miss Supranational Myanmar ===
Year	Hometown	Representative's Name	Title	Placement	Special Awards
2025	(Mandalay Region) Meiktila	Cherry Moe	1st Runner-up of Miss Universe Myanmar 2024	Unplaced	
2024	(Mon State) Thanbyuzayat	Myo Sandar Win - Dee	1st Runner-up of Miss Universe Myanmar 2023	Top 25	4 Special Awards: Miss Influencer Opportunity; Top 7 - Miss Talent; Top 10 - Supra Fan Vote; Top 11 - Supra Model of the Year (Top 3 - Supra Model of Asia)

=== Miss Earth ===
Year	Hometown	Representative's Name	Title	Placement	Special Awards
2024	(Bago Region) Taungoo	Thaw Dar Sun	4th Runner-up of Miss Universe Myanmar 2024	Unplaced	

=== Miss Grand International ===
Year	Hometown	Representative's Name	Title	Placement	Special Awards
2020	(Kayin State) Myawaddy	Han Lay	1st runner-up Miss Universe Myanmar 2020	Top 20	5 Special Awards: How to eat Thai food in 2 minute; How to get to know you in 1 minute; Pre-Arrival; Top 10 - Queen with the Golden Crown; Top 20 - Best in Swimsuit
2019	Myeik	Hmwe Thet	1st runner-up Miss Universe Myanmar 2019	Unplaced	5 Special Awards: The Historic Crowns Fashion Show Gala by George Wittels; Pre-Arrival; Top 10 -Miss Popular Vote; Top 10 - Best in Swimsuit; Top 10 - Best in National Costume
2018	Naypyitaw	Su Myat Phoo	1st runner-up Miss Universe Myanmar 2018	Unplaced	1 Special Awards: Top 10 - Best in National Costume
2017	(Yangon Region) Yangon	Aye Chan Moe	1st runner-up Miss Universe Myanmar 2013	Unplaced	2 Special Awards: Top 10 – Best in National Costume; Top 11 - Best in Swimsuit
2017	(Yangon Region) Yangon	Shwe Eain Si	1st runner-up Miss Universe Myanmar 2017	Dethroned	

=== Miss Intercontinental ===
Year	Home town	Representative's Name	National Title	Placement	Special Awards
2021	(Kachin State) Myitkyina	May Thazin Oo	2nd runner-up Miss Universe Myanmar 2020	Did not compete	
2019	(Mandalay Region) Mandalay	Htet Thiri Zaw	2nd runner-up Miss Universe Myanmar 2019	Unplaced	
2018	(Shan State) Tachileik	Nang Mway Phoung Loong	2nd runner-up Miss Universe Myanmar 2018	Top 20 Semi-finalists	1 Special Awards: Miss Ultra V

=== World Beauty Queen Myanmar ===
Year	Home town	Representative's Name	National Title	Placement	Special Awards
2019	(Kachin State) Myitkyina	Linn Htet Htet Kyaw	4th runner-up Miss Universe Myanmar 2019	Top 13 Semi-finalists	2 Special Awards: People's Choice; Top 5 - Best National Costume
2018	(Kachin State) Myitkyina	Roslynn Seng Nu Nu Pan	4th runner-up Miss Universe Myanmar 2018	Top 13 Semi-finalists	2 Special Awards: Miss Aura; SNS Popularity
2017	(Kachin State) Myitkyina	Ja Dim Kai	2nd runner-up Miss Universe Myanmar 2017	Top 16 Semi-finalists	1 Special Awards: Best Original Costume

=== Miss Tourism Queen Myanmar ===
Year	Home town	Representative's Name	National Title	Placement	Special Awards
2013	(Yangon Region) Yangon	Khin Lapyae Zaw	4th runner-up Miss Universe Myanmar 2017	Unplaced	1 Special Awards: Miss Personality

== National finalists ==
The following list is the national finalists of the Miss Universe Myanmar pageant, as well as the competition results.

Color keys
W Declared as the winner
Ended as a runner-up
Ended as a semi-finalist
Ended as a Quarterfinalist
– Did not participate
Withdraw during the competition

=== 2013-2022: No provincial title ===
Miss Universe Myanmar National Finalists 1st & 4th Editions (2013-2017), 8th Edition (2022)
Year No.	2013	2014	2015-2016	2017	2022
01	(Yangon Region) Yangon - Poe Kyar Phyu (Top 10)	(Yangon Region) Yangon - Chuu Nadi Khin	(Ayeyarwady Region) Pathein - Angel May	(Bago Region) Bago - Cherry Chit Chit Tun (Top 13)	(Mandalay Region) Mandalay - Amara Bo (Top 10)
02	(Yangon Region) Yangon - Shwe Thun Eain	(Mon State) Mawlamyine - Shwe Sin Ko Ko (2nd)	(Tanintharyi Region) Myeik - Win Nwe Oo	(Shan State) Kengtung - Mary Myint	(Yangon Region) Yangon - Aye Myat Thwe
03	(Yangon Region) Yangon - Hla Myat Thu	(Yangon Region) Yangon - Poe Ei Phyu Sin	(Sagaing Region) Monywa - Zun Pyae Phyo Maw	(Shan State) Lashio - Thun Wadi (3rd)	(Mandalay Region) Mandalay - Han Bo Bo (withdrew)
04	(Yangon Region) Yangon - Aye Chan Moe (1st)	(Yangon Region) Yangon - Sweety Ko (Top 5)	(Shan State) Taunggyi - Shwe Yoon Hlwar (Top 10)	(Kayah State) Loikaw - May Myat Noe Khin	(Yangon Region) Yangon - Hsu Labb Thaddar
05	(Yangon Region) Yangon - Michelle	(Yangon Region) Yangon - Su Nandar Aung	(Bago Region) Bago - Khun Nay Kyi Cho	(Magway Region) Magway - Pyae Wade Maung	(Yangon Region) Yangon - Kay Zin Khant (4th)
06	(Yangon Region) Yangon - One Thiri Phyo	(Yangon Region) Yangon - Zun Than Sin (Top 5)	(Shan State) Lashio - Nang Ngwe Hnin Hmone (Top 10)	(Mandalay Region) Mandalay - La Yaute Pyar (Top 13)	(Yangon Region) Yangon - Kendra Erika (3rd)
07	(Yangon Region) Yangon - Khin Khin Htay	(Yangon Region) Yangon - Khaing Mimi Zaw	(Yangon Region) Yangon - May Barani Thaw (W (2015))	(Mon State) Mawlamyine - Lai Lai Moe Kyaw	(Yangon Region) Yangon - Khin Lamin Thar
08	(Yangon Region) Yangon - Yu Thitsar Ko	(Sagaing Region) Hkamti - Shwe Thun Eain	(Yangon Region) Yangon - Poe Poe Shwe Ye (Top 10)	(Mandalay Region) Mogok - Lydia Saw	(Yangon Region) Yangon - May Htet Khine (Top 10)
09	(Yangon Region) Yangon - Emerald Nyein (Top 10)	(Mandalay Region) Pyin Oo Lwin - Queenie (Top 10)	(Yangon Region) Yangon - Hmwe Thet Lwin (Top 10)	(Sagaing Region) Monywa - Chaw Nandar Maung (Top 13)	(Mandalay Region) Mandalay - Myo Ko Ko San (Top 10)
10	(Yangon Region) Yangon - May Chit Pone (4th)	(Mandalay Region) Mandalay - Lin Latt Wint	(Mon State) Mawlamyine - Ei Phyo Thwe (3rd)	(Shan State) Muse - Phu Pwint Min	(Mon State) Mudon - Ni Ni Lin Eain (withdrew)
11	(Yangon Region) Yangon - Thet Htar (Top 10)	(Yangon Region) Yangon - Yoon Yati	(Yangon Region) Yangon - Ingyin May	(Tanintharyi Region) Myeik - Khine Zin Zaw	(Mon State) Paung - Phoo Pwint Sone
12	(Yangon Region) Yangon - Khin Myat Noe Oo	(Kachin State) Myitkyina - J-Naw (Top 10)	(Yangon Region) Yangon - Htet Htet Win (Top 10)	(Kachin State) Myitkyina - Ja Dim Kai (2nd)	(Yangon Region) Yangon - Sasha Viola (Top 10)
13	(Yangon Region) Yangon - Kyi Pyar (Top 10)	(Yangon Region) Yangon - Poe Kyar Phyu (Top 10)	(Bago Region) Pyay - Kay Khaing Myint	Naypyidaw - Myat Kyawt Khine (Top 13)	(Rakhine State) Sittwe - Soe Htet Nwe (Top 10)
14	(Yangon Region) Yangon - Yoon Me	(Yangon Region) Yangon - Zu Zu Myint Lwin	(Rakhine State) Sittwe - Cho Cho Tun (2nd)	(Ayeyarwady Region) Pathein - May Kabyar Oo	(Sagaing Region) Shwebo - Thinzar Min Htet (2nd)
15	(Mon State) Mawlamyine - Myat Hnin Phyu (2nd)	(Yangon Region) Yangon - Su Myat Noe Kyaw	(Mandalay Region) Mogok - Nadi Hlaing	(Bago Region) Pyay - Ei Ei Nyein (Top 13)	(Yangon Region) Yangon - Ya Mone (1st)
16	(Yangon Region) Yangon - Moe Set Wine (W)	(Mandalay Region) Mandalay - Yoon Mhi Mhi Kyaw (1st)	(Yangon Region) Yangon - Htet Htet Htun (W (2016))	(Rakhine State) Sittwe - Khine Thandar Linn (Top 13)	(Kachin State) Bhamo - Zar Li Moe (W)
17	(Yangon Region) Yangon - Khin Eain Si	(Yangon Region) Yangon - Hazel Nyi Nyi Htun	(Tanintharyi Region) Dawei - Yu Zu Na Htum	(Shan State) Taunggyi - Nann Thiri Han	—
18	(Yangon Region) Yangon - Nan Mwe Hom	(Yangon Region) Yangon - Sharr Htut Eaindra (W)	(Kachin State) Myitkyina - Oilaw Nang Seng Latt Mai	(Bago Region) Taungoo - Ei Sett Mon (Top 13)	—
19	(Tanintharyi Region) Kawthaung - Hnin Yamone Oo (3rd)	(Mandalay Region) Mandalay - May Zinmar Ko (Top 10)	(Yangon Region) Yangon - Su Myat Noe Yadanar	(Shan State) Tachileik - Nang Phong Tip	—
20	(Yangon Region) Yangon - Ngwe Hnin Hmone (Top 10)	(Shan State) Taunggyi - Eaint Myat Noe (Top 10)	(Mandalay Region) Mandalay - Han Lay (1st)	(Yangon Region) Yangon - Shwe Eain Si (1st)	—
21	—	—	—	(Yangon Region) Yangon - Khin La Pyae Zaw (4th)	—
22	—	—	—	(Yangon Region) Yangon - Soe Yadanar Htun	—
23	—	—	—	(Yangon Region) Yangon - Shun Yamone	—
24	—	—	—	(Yangon Region) Yangon - Zun Than Sin (W)	—
25	—	—	—	(Yangon Region) Yangon - Shin Min Set	—
26	—	—	—	(Yangon Region) Yangon - Nang Eaindray Shin (Top 13)	—
Total	20	20	20	26	16

=== 2018-2025: Township representatives ===
Miss Universe Myanmar National Finalists 3rd - 7th Editions (2015-2020), 10th - 12th Editions (2023-2025)
Year Capitals & Cities, etc.	2018	2019	2020	2023	2024	2025
(Yangon Region) Ahlone	—	—	—	—	—	Y
(Mandalay Region) Amarapura	—	—	Y	Y	Y	
(Shan State) Aungban	—	—	Y	Y	Y	
(Magway Region) Aunglan	—	—	—	—	Y	Y
(Mandalay Region) Bagan	Y				Y	Y
(Bago Region) Bago				Y	10	10
(Kachin State) Bhamo	—	—			Y	Y
(Yangon Region) Botahtaung	—	—	—	—	—	Y
(Tanintharyi Region) Dawei	13	13	10			Y
(Chin State) Falam	—	—	Y	Y	Y	Y
(Chin State) Hakha	—	—		Y	Y	
(Ayeyarwady Region) Hinthada	—	—	—	—	Y	
(Kayin State) Hlaingbwe	—	—	Y		Y	
(Kayin State) Hpa-An			10	16	10	
(Kachin State) Hpakant	Y	13	Y	11	Y	Y
(Yangon Region) Insein	—	—	—	—	—	16
(Mandalay Region) Innwa	—	—	—	—	Y	
(Bago Region) Intagaw	—	—	—	—	Y	
(Shan State) Kalaw	—	—	—	—	20	10
(Sagaing Region) Kalay	Y					
(Kayin State) Kawkareik	—	—	Y	16		
(Sagaing Region) Kawlin	—	—	Y			
(Tanintharyi Region) Kawthaung	—	—	—	—	20	10
(Shan State) Kengtung	—	—	—		Y	
(Shan State) Kutkai	—	—	—	Y	—	
(Mon State) Kyaikto	—	—	—	—	20	
(Shan State) Kyaukme	—	—	—	Y	—	
(Mandalay Region) Kyaukpadaung	—	—	—	—	Y	
(Mandalay Region) Kyaukse	Y			Y	Y	
(Yangon Region) Kyauktada	—	—	—	—	—	Y
(Shan State) Lashio	—	Y		Y	Y	Y
(Kayah State) Loikaw	13		Y			
(Magway Region) Magway	Y	Y	16		Y	Y
(Mandalay Region) Mandalay	Y		10	16	20	Y
(Mon State) Mawlamyine	Y	13	16			Y
(Yangon Region) Mayangone	—	—	—	—	—	Y
(Mandalay Region) Meiktila	Y			Y		
(Magway Region) Minbu	13		Y	—	Y	
(Mandalay Region) Mogok	13	Y	16	16	Y	
(Kachin State) Mohnyin	Y		Y			
(Sagaing Region) Monywa	—	Y	Y	Y	Y	
(Mon State) Mudon	—	—	—	—	Y	Y
(Shan State) Muse	—	13		16	Y	
(Kayin State) Myawaddy	13	13		—	20	
(Tanintharyi Region) Myeik	Y					Y
(Mandalay Region) Myingyan	—	—	—	—	Y	Y
(Kachin State) Myitkyina				11		
(Shan State) Nawnghkio	—	—	—	—	Y	
Naypyidaw		13	Y	11	Y	16
(Shan State) Nyaungshwe	—	—	Y			
(Magway Region) Pakokku	—	—	Y		Y	
(Ayeyarwady Region) Pathein	Y				10	10
(Shan State) Pindaya	—	—	Y		Y	
(Bago Region) Pyay	Y	Y	Y	Y	Y	Y
Pyinmana	—	—	—	Y		16
(Mandalay Region) Pyin Oo Lwin	Y	—	Y		20	
(Sagaing Region) Sagaing	Y	Y	16		Y	
(Kachin State) Shwegu	—	—	—	—	Y	
(Bago Region) Shwegyin	—	—	—	—	Y	
(Rakhine State) Sittwe	13			11	20	
(Shan State) Tachileik		Y	Y		20	16
(Shan State) Taunggyi	Y	Y	Y	11	10	16
(Bago Region) Taungoo	Y	Y	Y	Y		Y
(Yangon Region) Thanlyin	—	—	—	—	—	Y
(Mon State) Tha Htone	—	Y	Y	Y	Y	Y
(Mon State) Thanbyuzayat	—	—	Y	—	Y	
(Yangon Region) Thingangyun	—	—	—	—	—	16
(Kachin State) Waingmaw	—	—	—	—	20	
(Mandalay Region) Yamethin	—	—	—	Y	Y	
(Yangon Region) East Yangon	—	Y	10	Y	20	
(Yangon Region) North Yangon	13	Y	16	Y		
(Yangon Region) South Yangon	13	Y		Y		
(Yangon Region) West Yangon	Y	13	Y	Y	Y	
(Mon State) Ye	—	—	16			
Total	30	26	39	35	55	35
Color keys: : Declared as the winner; : Ended as a 1st runner-up; : Ended as a 2nd runner-up; : Ended as a 3rd runner-up; : Ended as a 4th runner-up; A : Ended as a finalist, semifinalist and unplaced; × : Ended as withdrew during the competition; × : Ended as no representative

== Participation ==
Year	City Debut
2015-16	(Bago Region) Bago, (Tanintharyi Region) Dawei, (Shan State) Lashio, (Mandalay Region) Mandalay, (Mon State) Mawlamyine, (Mandalay Region) Mogok, (Sagaing Region) Monywa, (Tanintharyi Region) Myeik, (Kachin State) Myitkyina, (Ayeyarwady Region) Pathein, (Bago Region) Pyay, (Rakhine State) Sittwe, (Shan State) Taunggyi, (Yangon Region) Yangon
2017	(Shan State) Kengtung, (Kayah State) Loikaw, (Magway Region) Magway, (Shan State) Muse, Naypyidaw, (Shan State) Tachileik, (Bago Region) Taungoo
2018	(Mandalay Region) Bagan, (Kayin State) Hpa-An, (Kachin State) Hpakant, (Sagaing Region) Kalay, (Mandalay Region) Kyaukse, (Mandalay Region) Meiktila, (Magway Region) Minbu, (Kachin State) Mohnyin, (Kayin State) Myawaddy, (Mandalay Region) Pyin Oo Lwin, (Sagaing Region) Sagaing, (Yangon Region) North Yangon, (Yangon Region) South Yangon, (Yangon Region) West Yangon
2019	(Mon State) Tha Htone, (Yangon Region) East Yangon
2020	(Mandalay Region) Amarapura, (Shan State) Aungban, (Kachin State) Bhamo, (Chin State) Falam, (Chin State) Hakha, (Kayin State) Hlaingbwe, (Kayin State) Kawkareik, (Sagaing Region) Kawlin, (Shan State) Nyaungshwe, (Magway Region) Pakokku, (Mon State) Thanbyuzayat, (Mon State) Ye
2023	(Shan State) Kutkai, Pyinmana
2024	(Magway Region) Aunglan, (Ayeyarwady Region) Hinthada, (Mandalay Region) Innwa, (Bago Region) Intagaw, (Shan State) Kalaw, (Tanintharyi Region) Kawthaung, (Mon State) Kyaikto, (Mandalay Region) Kyaukpadaung, (Mon State) Mudon, (Mandalay Region) Myingyan, (Shan State) Nawnghkio, (Kachin State) Shwegu, (Bago Region) Shwegyin, (Kachin State) Waingmaw, (Mandalay Region) Yamethin
2025	(Yangon Region) Ahlone, (Yangon Region) Botahtaung, (Yangon Region) Insein, (Yangon Region) Kyauktada, (Yangon Region) Mayangon, (Yangon Region) Thanlyin, (Yangon Region) Thingangyun
2026	(Rakhine State) Kyauk Phyu, (Ayeyarwady Region) Maubin

== List of Miss Universe Myanmar Cities ==
This is a list of cities that have participated in the Miss Universe Myanmar pageant (until 2025 edition).

=== Entrants 2015/16—Present ===
City/District	Debut	Participations	Years competed	City title	Placements	Best placement	First placed	Last placed	Notes	2026 Candidates
(Yangon Region) Ahlone	2025	1	2025	Miss Universe Ahlone	0					
(Mandalay Region) Amarapura	2020	2	2020; 2023	Miss Universe Amarapura	0					
(Shan State) Aungban	2020	4	2020; 2023–2024; 2026	Miss Universe Aungban	1	Top 20: Wint Shwe Yee Lin (2026)	2026: Wint Shwe Yee Lin (Top 20)	2026: Wint Shwe Yee Lin (Top 20)		Wint Shwe Yee Lin
(Magway Region) Aunglan	2024	2	2024–2025	Miss Universe Aunglan	0					
(Mandalay Region) Bagan	2018	3	2018; 2024–2025	Miss Universe Bagan	0					
(Bago Region) Bago	2015-16	7	2015/16–2018; 2023–present	Miss Universe Bago	5	Winner: Hnin Thway Yu Aung (2018)	2017: Cherry Chit Chit Tun (Top 13)	2026: Poe Pandra (5th runner up)	Won Miss Photogenic in 2024; Best National Costume in 2026	Poe Pandra
(Kachin State) Bhamo	2020	4	2020; 2023–2025	Miss Universe Bhamo	2	2nd runner-up: Khaymar Budathoki (2023)	2020: Naw Christine (5th runner-up)	2023: Khaymar Budathoki (2nd runner-up)		
(Yangon Region) Botahtaung	2025	1	2025	Miss Universe Botahtaung	0					
(Tanintharyi Region) Dawei	2015-16	6	2015/16; 2018–2020; 2025–present	Miss Universe Dawei	3	Top 10: Eaint Chuu Thar (2020)	2018: August Moe (Top 13)	2020: Eaint Chuu Thar (Top 10)	Won Best in National Costume in 2020	May Zin Aung
(Chin State) Falam	2020	4	2020; 2023–2025	Miss Universe Falam	0					
(Chin State) Hakha	2020	4	2020; 2023–2025	Miss Universe Hakha	2	Winner: Thuzar Wint Lwin (2020)	2020: Thuzar Wint Lwin (Winner)	2025: Nan Inzali (1st runner-up)	Won Miss Photogenic in 2020; Best in National Costume in 2023	
(Ayeyarwady Region) Hinthada	2024	1	2024	Miss Universe Hinthada	0					
(Kayin State) Hlaingbwe	2020	2	2020; 2024	Miss Universe Hlaingbwe	0					
(Kayin State) Hpa-An	2018	6	2018–2020; 2023–2024 2026	Miss Universe Hpa-An	6	Winner: Swe Zin Htet (2019); May Grace Parry (2026)	2018: Myint Moh May (3rd runner-up)	2026: May Grace Parry (Winner)	Won Miss Photogenic in 2018; Best in Swimsuit in 2019; Top 5 Best in National Costume in 2020; Best in Evening Gown in 2024	May Grace Parry
(Kachin State) Hpakant	2018	7	2018–2020; 2023–present	Miss Universe Hpakant	2	Top 11: Pyae Kaung Su Thant (2023)	2019: Htu Seng (Top 13)	2023: Pyae Kaung Su Thant (Top 11)		Mona
(Yangon Region) Insein	2025	1	2025	Miss Universe Insein	1	Top 16: Nang Sam Phaung (2025)	2025: Nang Sam Phaung (Top 16)	2025: Nang Sam Phaung (Top 16)		
(Mandalay Region) Innwa	2024	1	2024	Miss Universe Innwa	0					
(Bago Region) Intagaw	2024	1	2024	Miss Universe Intagaw	0					
(Shan State) Kalaw	2024	3	2024–present	Miss Universe Kalaw	2	Top 10: Soe San Nan (2025)	2024: Pandora Htoo (Top 20)	2025: Soe San Nan (Top 10)		Chue Thawdar
(Sagaing Region) Kalay	2018	1	2018	Miss Universe Kalay	0					
(Kayin State) Kawkareik	2020	2	2020; 2023	Miss Universe Kawkareik	1	Top 16: Lily (2023)	2023: Lily (Top 16)	2023: Lily (Top 16)		
(Sagaing Region) Kawlin	2020	1	2020	Miss Universe Kawlin	0					
(Tanintharyi Region) Kawthaung	2024	3	2024–present	Miss Universe Kawthaung	2	Top 10: Holly Yuriko (2025)	2024: Phyo Thinzar Zaw (Top 20)	2025: Holly Yuriko (Top 10)	Won Miss Photogenic in 2025	May Thazin Wint Htal
(Shan State) Kengtung	2017	4	2017; 2023–2024 2026	Miss Universe Kengtung	1	Winner: Amara Bo (2023)	2023: Amara Bo (Winner)	2023: Amara Bo (Winner)		Pan Ei Phyu
(Shan State) Kutkai	2023	2	2023 2026	Miss Universe Kutkai	0					Saung Hnin Mone
(Mon State) Kyaikto	2024	1	2024	Miss Universe Kyaikto	1	Top 20: Wint Yadanar Linn (2024)	2024: Wint Yadanar Linn (Top 20)	2024: Wint Yadanar Linn (Top 20)		
(Mandalay Region) Kyaukpadaung	2024	2	2024 2026	Miss Universe Kyaukpadaung	1	Top 20: Chue (2026)	2026: Chue (Top 20)	2026: Chue (Top 20)	Won Miss Congeniality in 2026	Chue
(Rakhine State) Kyauk Phyu	2026	1	2026	Miss Universe Kyauk Phyu	1	Top 7: Thet Htar Shwe Sin (2026)	2026: Thet Htar Shwe Sin (Top 7)	2026: Thet Htar Shwe Sin (Top 7)		Thet Htar Shwe Sin
(Mandalay Region) Kyaukse	2018	4	2018; 2023–2024 2026	Miss Universe Kyaukse	1	Top 20: Shin Min Wine (2026)	2026: Shin Min Wine (Top 20)	2026: Shin Min Wine (Top 20)		Shin Min Wine
(Yangon Region) Kyauktada	2025	1	2025	Miss Universe Kyauktada	0					
(Shan State) Lashio	2015-16	6	2015/16–2017; 2019; 2023–2025	Miss Universe Lashio	2	3rd runner-up: Thun Wadi (2017)	2015-16: Nang Ngwe Hnin Hmone (Top 10)	2017: Thun Wadi (3rd runner-up)		
(Kayah State) Loikaw	2017	3	2017–2018; 2020	Miss Universe Loikaw	1	Top 13: Khin Myat Myat Thu (2018)	2018: Khin Myat Myat Thu (Top 13)	2018: Khin Myat Myat Thu (Top 13)		
(Magway Region) Magway	2017	7	2017–2020; 2024–present	Miss Universe Magway	1	Top 16: Yoon Ei Khai (2020)	2020: Yoon Ei Khai (Top 16)	2020: Yoon Ei Khai (Top 16)	Won Best in Talent in 2018	Eaint Hume Khin
(Mandalay Region) Mandalay	2015-16	9	2015/16–2020; 2023–present	Miss Universe Mandalay	7	1st runner-up: Han Lay (2015-16)	2015-16: Han Lay (1st runner-up)	2026: May Thitsar Khin (Top 12)	Won Best in National Costume in 2015-16	May Thitsar Khin
(Ayeyarwady Region) Maubin	2026	0	2026	Miss Universe Maubin	0					Nay Nadi Ko
(Mon State) Mawlamyine	2015-16	9	2015/16–2020; 2023–present	Miss Universe Mawlamyine	5	1st runner-up: Dee (2023)	2015-16: Ei Phyo Thwe (3rd runner-up)	2026: Yoon Mi (Top 20)	Won Best in Swimsuit in 2023	Yoon Mi
(Yangon Region) Mayangone	2025	1	2025	Miss Universe Mayangone	TBA					
(Mandalay Region) Meiktila	2018	5	2018; 2023–present	Miss Universe Meiktila	2	1st runner-up: Cherry Moe (2024)	2024: Cherry Moe (1st runner-up)	2025: Zuly Wint Htal (3rd runner-up)		Laung Laung
(Magway Region) Minbu	2018	4	2018–2020; 2024	Miss Universe Minbu	2	3rd runner-up: Htun Palal Yadanar (2019)	2018: Eain Thet Hmue (Top 13)	2019: Htun Palal Yadanar (3rd runner-up)	Won Best in National Costume in 2018	
(Mandalay Region) Mogok	2015-16	8	2015/16–2020; 2023–2025	Miss Universe Mogok	4	4th runner-up: Myo Ko Ko San (2025)	2018: Sue Ro Hnine (Top 13)	2025: Myo Ko Ko San (4th runner-up)		
(Kachin State) Mohnyin	2018	2	2018; 2020	Miss Universe Mohnyin	0					
(Sagaing Region) Monywa	2015-16	5	2015/16–2017; 2019–2023	Miss Universe Monywa	1	Top 13: Chaw Nandar Maung (2017)	2017: Chaw Nandar Maung (Top 13)	2017: Chaw Nandar Maung (Top 13)		
(Mon State) Mudon	2024	2	2024–2025	Miss Universe Mudon	0				Won Best in National Costume in 2025	
(Shan State) Muse	2017	4	2017; 2019; 2023 2026	Miss Universe Muse	2	Top 13: Mary Htang Htang (2019)	2019: Mary Htang Htang (Top 13)	2023: Seng Pan Htoi (Top 16)		Nan Mwan Hom Aye
(Kayin State) Myawaddy	2018	5	2018-2020; 2024 2026	Miss Universe Myawaddy	5	1st runner-up: Han Lay (2020)	2018: Nann Htet Htet Linn (Top 13)	2026: San Yoon Nadi (Top 12)	Won Miss Best Body in 2018; 2nd runner-up of Best Talent in 2019; Miss Beautiful Smile in 2020	San Yoon Nadi
(Tanintharyi Region) Myeik	2015-16	6	2015/16–2019; 2025–present	Miss Universe Myeik	2	1st runner-up: Hmwe Thet (2019)	2019: Hmwe Thet (1st runner-up)	2026: August Moe (Top 12)		August Moe
(Mandalay Region) Myingyan	2024	2	2024–2025	Miss Universe Myingyan	0					
(Kachin State) Myitkyina	2015-16	9	2015/16–2020; 2023–present	Miss Universe Myitkyina	8	2nd runner-up: Ja Dim Kai (2017); May Thazin Oo (2020)	2017: Ja Dim Kai (2nd runner-up)	2026: Mai Mai (Top 20)	Won Best in Swimsuit in 2026	Mai Mai
(Shan State) Nawnghkio	2024	1	2024	Miss Universe Nawnghkio	0					
Naypyidaw	2017	8	2017–2020; 2023–present	Miss Universe Naypyidaw	6	1st runner-up: Su Myat Phoo (2018)	2017: Myat Kyawt Khine (Top 13)	2026: Sitt Loon Yadanar (Top 20)		Sitt Loon Yadanar
(Shan State) Nyaungshwe	2020	2	2020 2026	Miss Universe Nyaungshwe	0					Rosy
(Magway Region) Pakokku	2020	3	2020; 2024 2026	Miss Universe Pakokku	0					Yadanar Moe Aung
(Ayeyarwady Region) Pathein	2015-16	9	2015/16–2020; 2023–present	Miss Universe Pathein	5	4th runner-up: Mya San Thidar (2020); No No May (2023)	2019: Su Su Sandy (5th runner-up)	2025: Yan Yan (Top 10)	Won Best in National Costume in 2023	Heather San
Pindaya	2020	3	2020; 2024 2026	Miss Universe Pindaya	0					Angel Moe
(Bago Region) Pyay	2015-16	8	2015/16–2020; 2023–2024 2026	Miss Universe Pyay	1	Top 13: Ei Ei Nyein (2017)	2017: Ei Ei Nyein (Top 13)	2017: Ei Ei Nyein (Top 13)		Lin Yati
Pyinmana	2023	3	2023; 2025–present	Miss Universe Pyinmana	1	Top 16: Khin Bhone (2025)	2025: Khin Bhone (Top 16)	2025: Khin Bhone (Top 16)		Khaing Zin Win
(Mandalay Region) Pyin Oo Lwin	2018	6	2018; 2020; 2023–present	Miss Universe Pyin Oo Lwin	4	Winner: Myat Yadanar Soe (2025)	2023: Thin Sandar Pyae Thiha Aung (5th runner-up)	2026: Nway Nway Thu Aung (Top 20)		Nway Nway Thu Aung
(Sagaing Region) Sagaing	2018	4	2018–2020; 2024	Miss Universe Sagaing	1	Top 16: Engyin Phoo (2020)	2020: Engyin Phoo (Top 16)	2020: Engyin Phoo (Top 16)		
(Kachin State) Shwegu	2024	1	2024	Miss Universe Shwegu	0					
(Bago Region) Shwegyin	2024	1	2024	Miss Universe Shwegyin	0					
(Rakhine State) Sittwe	2015-16	7	2015/16–18; 2023–present	Miss Universe Sittwe	7	2nd runner-up: Cho Cho Tun (2015-16); Khine Swe Zin Thinn (2025)	2015-16: Cho Cho Tun (2nd runner-up)	2026: Saw La Pyae (3rd runner-up)		Saw La Pyae Won
(Shan State) Tachileik	2017	7	2017–2020; 2023–2025	Miss Universe Tachileik	4	2nd runner-up: Nang Mway Phoung Loong (2018)	2018: Nang Mway Phoung Loong (2nd runner-up)	2025: Su Lae Yati (Top 16)		
(Shan State) Taunggyi	2015-16	9	2015/16–2020; 2023–present	Miss Universe Taunggyi	4	Top 10: Shwe Yoon Hlwar (2015-16); Shin Yoon Eain (2024)	2015-16: Shwe Yoon Hlwar (Top 10)	2025: Nang Teint Nadi Lwin (Top 16)	Won Best in Sportswear in 2024	Naw MarNal LahBwe Khu
(Bago Region) Taungoo	2017	7	2017–2020; 2023–2024 2026	Miss Universe Taungoo	3	1st runner-up: Han Theint Theint Aung (2026)	2017: Ei Sett Mon (Top 13)	2026: Han Theint Theint Aung (1st runner-up)		Han Theint Teint Aung
(Mon State) Thanbyuzayat	2020	2	2020; 2024	Miss Universe Thanbyuzayat	0					
(Yangon Region) Thanlyin	2025	2	2025–present	Miss Universe Thanlyin	1	Top 20: Saw Yu Nwe Zin (2026)	2026: Saw Yu Nwe Zin (Top 20)	2026: Saw Yu Nwe Zin (Top 20)		Saw Yu Nwe Zin
(Mon State) Thaton	2019	3	2019–2020; 2024	Miss Universe Thaton	0					
(Yangon Region) Thingangyun	2025	1	2025	Miss Universe Thingangyun	1	Top 16: Thet Htet Htet San (2025)	2025: Thet Htet Htet San (Top 16)	2025: Thet Htet Htet San (Top 16)		
(Kachin State) Waingmaw	2024	1	2024	Miss Universe Waingmaw	1	Top 20: Nan Aye Kham Sung (2024)	2024: Nan Aye Kham Sung (Top 20)	2024: Nan Aye Kham Sung (Top 20)		
(Mandalay Region) Yamethin	2024	2	2024 2026	Miss Universe Yamethin	0					Nan Akari
(Yangon Region) East Yangon	2019	5	2019–2020; 2023–2024 2026	Miss Universe Yangon-East	3	Top 10: Soe Yadanar Htun (2020)	2020: Soe Yadanar Htun (Top 10)	2026: Mon Daewi (Top 12)		Mon Daewi
(Yangon Region) North Yangon	2018	6	2018–2020; 2023–2024 2026	Miss Universe Yangon-North	4	Winner: Thet San Andersen (2024)	2018: Htun Eaindra Shin (Top 13)	2026: Angel Kyi Phyu (Top 12)		Angel Kyi Phyu
(Yangon Region) South Yangon	2018	6	2018–2020; 2023–2024 2026	Miss Universe Yangon-South	4	2nd runner-up: Han Lay (2024)	2018: Khaing Kyi Pyar (Top 13)	2026: Shwe Chue Ngone (4th runner up)	Won Best in National Costume in 2024	Shwe Chue Ngone
(Yangon Region) West Yangon	2018	4	2018–2019; 2024 2026	Miss Universe Yangon-West	2	2nd runner up: Kyaw Kyaw Eaindra (2026)	2019: Noe No K (Top 13)	2026: Kyaw Kyaw Eaindra (2nd runner up)	Won Best in Evening Gown in 2026	Kyaw Kyaw Eaindra
(Mon State) Ye	2020	1	2020	Miss Universe Ye	1	Top 16: Yu Htay Thwel (2020)	2020: Yu Htay Thwel (Top 16)	2020: Yu Htay Thwel (Top 16)		

== See also ==
- List of beauty pageants
- Miss Universe Mandalay
