= Miss Universe Myanmar 2025 =

2025 beauty pageant in Myanmar

- Date: 27 June 2025
- Presenters: Aung Pyae Phyo
- Entertainment: Project K (band); Nay Win
- Venue: Myanmar Expo Hall, Yangon, Myanmar
- Broadcaster: Hey Play; Htv Channel
- Entrants: 35
- Placements: 16
- Debuts: Ahlone; Botahtaung; Insein; Mayangone; Thingangyun; Kyauktada; Thanlyin
- Withdrawals: Aungban; Hinthada; Hlaingbwe; Hpa-an; Innwa; Intagaw; Kengtung; Kyaikto; Kyaukpadaung; Kyaukse; Minbu; Myawaddy; Nawnghkio; Pakokku; Pindaya; Pyay; Sagaing; Shwegu; Shwegyin; Taungoo; Thanbyuzayat; Yamethin; East Yangon; North Yangon; South Yangon; West Yangon
- Returns: Dawei; Myeik; Pyinmana
- Winner: (Mandalay Region) Pyinoolwin; Myat Yadanar Soe
- Best National Costume: (Mon State) Mudon; Myat Wutt Yi Thin
- Photogenic: (Tanintharyi Region) Kawthaung; Holly Yuriko

Miss Universe Myanmar 2025 was the twelfth Miss Universe Myanmar pageant. It was held at the Myanmar Expo Hall in Yangon, Myanmar, on 27 June 2025.

Thet San Andersen of North Yangon crowned her successor Myat Yadanar Soe of Pyin Oo Lwin at the end of the event. Myat Yadanar Soe represented Myanmar at Miss Universe 2025 in Thailand.

== Background ==
For the camp period of the competition, the 35 contestants went to numerous sponsor visits.

The following is a list of the main events of this year's contest.

- 18 June: National costume competition
- 25 June: Preliminary competition
- 27 June: Coronation Night

=== Selection of participants ===
The 2025 edition marked the debut of the following regions and townships in the pageant: Ahlone, Botahtaung, Insein, Mayangone, Myeik, Thingangyun, Kyauktada, and Thanlyin.

=== Withdrawals ===
This year, the cities and districts eligible for selection of participants were reset, resulting in the elimination of approximately 26 cities and districts compared to the previous edition.

== Results ==
Color keys

- The contestant Won in an International pageant.
- The contestant was a Runner-up in an International pageant.
- The contestant was a Semi-Finalist in an International pageant.
- The contestant assumed another title.
- The contestant was not able to compete in an International pageant.
- The contestant did not place but won a Special Award in the pageant.
- The contestant did not place.

Final results	Contestant	International pageant	International Results	Note
Miss Universe Myanmar 2025 (Winner)	(Mandalay Region) Pyin Oo Lwin – Myat Yadanar Soe	Miss Universe 2025	Unplaced	
1st runner-up (Resigned)	(Chin State) Hakha – Nan Inzali	Miss International 2025	Top 10	After resigning, she was chosen as Miss International Myanmar 2025 by Mingalarpar Miss Myanmar Organization and she brings the top 10 placement with 2 special awards at Miss International 2025.
2nd runner-up	(Rakhine State) Sittwe – Khine Swe Zin Thinn			
3rd runner-up (Resigned)	(Mandalay Region) Meiktila – Zuly Wint Htal			
4th runner-up	(Mandalay Region) Mogok – Myo Ko Ko San			
5th runner-up	(Kachin State) Myitkyina – Mary Ja Doi Awng §	Miss Teen International 2026	Top 18	
Top 10	(Bago Region) Bago – Khin Yadanar Soe			
Top 10	(Shan State) Kalaw – Soe San Nan			
Top 10	(Tanintharyi Region) Kawthaung – Holly Yuriko			
Top 10	(Ayeyarwady Region) Pathein – Yan Yan			
Top 16	(Yangon Region) Insein – Nang Sam Phaung			
Top 16	Naypyitaw – Thet Htar Khin			
Top 16	Pyinmana – Khin Bhone			
Top 16	(Shan State) Tachileik – Su Lae Yati			
Top 16	(Shan State) Taunggyi – Nang Teint Nadi Lwin			
Top 16	(Yangon Region) Thingangyun - Thet Htet Htet San			

§ – Bigo Live Myanmar Voting

== Awards ==
=== Special awards ===
Award	Contestant
Miss Photogenic by Studio Paparazzi	(Tanintharyi Region) Kawthaung - Holly Yuriko
Miss Picture Perfect by Love Diary	(Chin State) Hakha - Nan Inzali
Best Catwalk by Lily Shoes	(Mandalay Region) Pyin Oo Lwin - Myat Yadanar Soe
Rising Star by Hey Play	(Shan State) Kalaw - Soe San Nan
Miss Beauty Skin by Mistine	(Shan State) Taunggyi - Nang Teint Nadi Lwin
Miss Popular Choice by Bigo Live	(Mandalay Region) Mogok - Myo Ko Ko San
Miss Elegant by Sein Nan Daw	(Ayeyarwady Region) Pathein - Yan Yan
Miss Congeniality	(Tanintharyi Region) Dawei - Moe Kalayar
Miss Celestial Nail by Luna	(Chin State) Hakha - Nan Inzali
Miss Beautiful Smile by My Dentist	(Shan State) Kalaw - Soe San Nan
Miss Crystal Vision by Zeekwek	(Ayeyarwady Region) Pathein - Yan Yan
Miss Beauty of Face by Mistine	(Chin State) Hakha - Nan Inzali
Miss Perfect Hair by SOS	(Chin State) Hakha - Nan Inzali
Miss Myanmar Beauty by Doctor A	(Mandalay Region) Pyin Oo Lwin - Myat Yadanar Soe
Miss IM	(Chin State) Hakha - Nan Inzali
Miss Elegant	(Yangon Region) North Yangon - Thet San Andersen
Best City Director	(Kachin State) Myitkyina

=== Challenge winners ===
Title		Candidate
National Costume	Winner	(Mon State) Mudon – Myat Wutt Yi Thin
National Costume	Top 5	(Mandalay Region) Meiktila – Zuly Wint Htal
National Costume	Top 5	(Chin State) Falam – Mai Aye Sandar Aung
National Costume	Top 5	(Mandalay Region) Pyin Oo Lwin – Myat Yadanar Soe
National Costume	Top 5	(Shan State) Taunggyi – Nang Theint Nadi Lwin
National Costume	People's Choice Winner	(Chin State) Hakha – Nan Inzali
National Costume	National Director Choice	(Yangon Region) Thingangyun – Thet Htet Htet San
Glamorous Universe	Diamond Winner	(Mandalay Region) Bago – Khin Yadanar Soe
Glamorous Universe	Gold Winner	(Mandalay Region) Meiktila – Zuly Wint Htal
Glamorous Universe	Silver Winner	(Ayeyarwady Region) Pathein – Yan Yan
Best in Swimsuit Photo	Gold Winner	(Mandalay Region) Mogok – Myo Ko Ko San
Best in Swimsuit Photo	Silver Winner	(Chin State) Hakha – Nan Inzali
Best in Swimsuit Photo	Bronze Winner	(Rakhine State) Sittwe – Khine Swe Zin Thinn
Best Headshot	Gold Winner	(Mandalay Region) Bago – Khin Yadanar Soe
Best Headshot	Silver Winner	(Ayeyarwady Region) Pathein – Yan Yan
Best Headshot	Bronze Winner	(Chin State) Hakha – Nan Inzali

== Contestants ==
35 contestants have been confirmed to participate, all representing their respective cities and districts.

City/District	Candidate	Age	Height	Hometown	Placement
(Yangon Region) Ahlone	Ei Kyar Phyu				
(Magway Region) Aunglan	Yoon Myint Moo				
(Mandalay Region) Bagan	Khít Thakhin Kha				
(Bago Region) Bago	Khin Yadanar Soe				
(Kachin State) Bhamo	Wa Thone San				
(Yangon Region) Botahtaung	Rosey Swel Swel	23	1.68 m (5 ft 6 in)	Yangon	
(Tanintharyi Region) Dawei	Moe Kalayar				
(Chin State) Falam	Mai Aye Sandar Aung				
(Chin State) Hakha	Nan Inzali				
(Kachin State) Hpakant	Maran Jaseng	21	1.68 m (5 ft 6 in)	Myitkyina	
(Yangon Region) Insein	Nang San Phaung	26	1.77 m (5 ft 9 1/2 in)	Yangon	
(Shan State) Kalaw	Soe San Nan	20	1.75 m (5 ft 9 in)	Yangon	
(Tanintharyi Region) Kawthaung	Holly Yuriko	38	1.68 m (5 ft 6 in)	Yangon	
(Yangon Region) Kyauktada	Lily Liang				
(Shan State) Lashio	Nana Kaday Htun				
(Magway Region) Magway	Ywoon Myat Myat Htet				
(Mandalay Region) Mandalay	Nang Thazin Aung				
(Mon State) Mawlamyine	June Yadanar				
(Yangon Region) Mayangone	Yu Ya				
(Mandalay Region) Meiktila	Zuly Wint Htal				
(Mandalay Region) Mogok	Myo Ko Ko San	31	1.75 m (5 ft 9 in)	Mandalay	
(Mon State) Mudon	Myat Wutt Yi Thin				
(Tanintharyi Region) Myeik	Anzali Phway				
(Mandalay Region) Myingyan	Yu Ei Mon				
(Kachin State) Myitkyina	Mary Ja Doi Awng	20	1.68 m (5 ft 6 in)	Myitkyina	
Naypyitaw	Thet Htar Khin	28	1.73 m (5 ft 8 in)	Mandalay	
(Ayeyarwady Region) Pathein	Yan Yan	20	1.73 m (5 ft 8 in)	Yangon	
(Mandalay Region) Pyin Oo Lwin	Myat Yadanar Soe			Mandalay	
Pyinmana	Khin Bhone				
(Rakhine State) Sittwe	Khine Swe Zin Thinn	20	1.68 m (5 ft 6 in)	Yangon	
(Shan State) Tachileik	Su Lae Yati				
(Shan State) Taunggyi	Nang Teint Nadi Lwin				
(Mon State) Tha Htone	Yui Yu				
(Yangon Region) Thanlyin	Aye Shwe Yi Aung				
(Yangon Region) Thingangyun	Thet Htet Htet San				

=== Replacements ===
- (Mandalay Region) Mogok – Miss Universe Mogok 2025 Khit Lin Latt Yoon withdrew for personal reasons. Myo Ko Ko San replaced her for the event.

=== Withdrawals ===
- (Shan State) Aungban
- (Ayeyarwady Region) Hinthada
- (Kayin State) Hlaingbwe
- (Kayin State) Hpa-an
- (Mandalay Region) Innwa
- (Bago Region) Intagaw
- (Shan State) Kengtung
- (Mon State) Kyaikto
- (Mandalay Region) Kyaukpadaung
- (Mandalay Region) Kyaukse
- (Magway Region) Minbu
- (Kayin State) Myawaddy
- (Shan State) Nawnghkio
- (Magway Region) Pakokku
- (Shan State) Pindaya
- (Bago Region) Pyay
- (Sagaing Region) Sagaing
- (Kachin State) Shwegu
- (Bago Region) Shwegyin
- (Bago Region) Taungoo
- (Mon State) Thanbyuzayat
- (Mandalay Region) Yamethin
- (Yangon Region) East Yangon
- (Yangon Region) North Yangon
- (Yangon Region) South Yangon
- (Yangon Region) West Yangon

=== Returns ===
- (Tanintharyi Region) Dawei
- (Tanintharyi Region) Myeik
- Pyinmana
