= Miss Universe Myanmar 2026 =

2026 beauty pageant in Myanmar

- May Grace Parry, Miss Universe Myanmar 2026
- Date: 17 June 2026
- Presenters: Kyaw Htet Aung
- Entertainment: Nay Win
- Venue: Hexagon Complex, Yangon, Myanmar
- Broadcaster: SNDSY Entertainment Channel; YouTube
- Entrants: 38
- Placements: 20
- Debuts: Kyauk Pyu; Maubin
- Winner: (Kayin State) Hpa-An; May Grace Parry
- Best National Costume: (Bago Region) Bago; Poe Pandra

Miss Universe Myanmar 2026 was the 13th edition of the Miss Universe Myanmar pageant. The preliminary competition was held on 16 June 2026 at Hexagon Complex in Yangon, while the final competition was held on 17 June 2026 at the same venue.

At the end of the event, Myat Yadanar Soe of Pyin Oo Lwin crowned May Grace Parry of Hpa-An as her successor. May Grace Parry will represent Myanmar at Miss Universe 2026.

== Background ==
For the camp period of the competition, the 38 contestants are set to participate in numerous activities planned by the organisation.

The following is a list of the main events of this year's contest.

- 16 June: Preliminary Competition
- 17 June: National costume competition
- 17 June: Coronation Night

== Selection Of Participants ==
The competitors are selected through 11 regional pageants and 1 special program to identify 38 title holders. The 2026 edition marked the debut of the following regions and townships in the pageant: Kyauk Pyu and Maubin.

The following details provinces that organized regional contests for Miss Universe Myanmar 2026.

Host provinces	Date	Titles	Total titles	Notes
Miss Universe Muse	February 19, 2026	Miss Universe Muse, Miss Universe Kutkai	2	
Miss Universe Yangon East	March 17 , 2026	Miss Universe Yangon-East, Miss Universe Kyaukpyu, Miss Universe Hpa-An	3	
Miss Universe Pindaya & Aungban	March 30, 2026	Miss Universe Pindaya, Miss Universe Aungban	2	
Miss Universe Naypyidaw	April 5, 2026	Miss Universe Naypyidaw, Miss Universe Pyinmana, Miss Universe Taungoo	3	
Miss Universe Kyaukse	April 7, 2026	Miss Universe Kyaukse	1	
Miss Universe Sittwe & Thanlyin	April 8, 2026	Miss Universe Sittwe, Miss Universe Thanlyin, Miss Universe Magway, Miss Universe Nyaungshwe, Miss Universe Maubin,	5	
Miss Universe Bago	April 9, 2026	Miss Universe Bago	1	
Miss Universe Mandalay	April 30, 2026	Miss Universe Mandalay, Miss Universe Pyinoolwin, Miss Universe Paokku, Miss Universe Yamethin, Miss Universe Kyaukpadaung, Miss Universe Meikhtila	6	
Miss Universe Myitkyina	April 30, 2026	Miss Universe Myitkyina, Miss Universe Hpakant	2	
Miss Universe Yangon North	May 2, 2026	Miss Universe Yangon North, Miss Universe Pathein, Miss Universe Pyay, Miss Universe Kyaingtong	4	
Miss Universe Myawaddy	May 3, 2026	Miss Universe Myawaddy, Miss Universe Kalaw, Miss Universe Dawei, Miss Universe Kawthaung	4	
Final Calling from (YOU)niverse	May 3, 2026	Miss Universe Yangon West, Miss Universe Yangon South, Miss Universe Myeik, Miss Universe Mawlamyine	4	Special Program

== Judges ==
The judges for Miss Universe Myanmar 2026 include:

- Natalie Glebova – Miss Universe 2005
- Ahtisa Manalo – Miss Universe Philippines 2025, 3rd runner-up at Miss Universe 2025
- Pawee Ventura – Founder and CEO of Missosology
- Thandar Hlaing – Former Burmese beauty queen and pageant industry personality
- Htoo Ant Lwin - Miss Universe Myanmar National Director and President of Mingalarpar Miss Myanmar
- Sora - Professional Makeup artist and mentor
- Doctor A - LGBTQ activist and aesthetic doctor

=== Special guests ===
- Bea Millan-Windorski – Miss Universe Philippines 2026

== Results ==
- The contestant Won in an International pageant.
- The contestant was a Runner-up in an International pageant.
- The contestant was a Semi-Finalist in an International pageant.
- The contestant assumed another title.
- The contestant was not able to compete in an International pageant.
- The contestant did not place but won a Special Award in the pageant.
- The contestant did not place.

Final results	Contestant	International pageant	International results	Notes
Miss Universe Myanmar 2026 (Winner)	(Kayin State) Hpa-An – May Grace Parry	Miss Universe 2026	TBA	
1st runner-up	(Bago Region) Taungoo – Han Theint Theint Aung	Miss World 2026	Unplaced Top Model Challenge (Top 60)	
2nd runner-up	(Yangon Region) Yangon West – Kyaw Kyaw Eaindra	Miss Global 2026	4th Runner-up Miss Global 2026 Special Awards: Best Video Introduction, Best Evening Gown & V Square Clinic - Global Icon	4th Runner-up Miss Grand Myanmar 2024
3rd runner-up	(Rakhine State) Sittwe – Saw La Pyae Won	Miss International 2026	TBA	
4th runner-up	(Yangon Region) Yangon South – Shwe Chue Ngone			Top 20 Miss Grand Myanmar 2024
5th runner-up	(Bago Region) Bago – Poe Pandra	Miss Intercontinental 2026	TBA	
Top 7	(Rakhine State) Kyaukpyu – Thet Htar Shwe Sin			Top 20 Miss Grand Myanmar 2024
Top 12	(Mandalay Region) Mandalay – May Thitsar Khin			
Top 12	(Kayin State) Myawaddy – San Yoon Nadi			
Top 12	(Tanintharyi Region) Myeik – August Moe	Miss Multinational 2018		
Top 12	(Yangon Region) Yangon East – Mon Daewi §			
Top 12	(Yangon Region) Yangon North – Angel Kyi Phyu			2nd Runner-up Miss Grand Myanmar 2024
Top 20	(Shan State) Aungban – Wint Shwe Yee Lin			
Top 20	(Mandalay Region) Kyaukpadaung – Chuu			
Top 20	(Mandalay Region) Kyaukse – Shin Min Wine			
Top 20	(Mon State) Mawlamyine – Yoon Mi			
Top 20	(Kachin State) Myitkyina – Mai Mai			
Top 20	Naypyidaw – Sitt Lon Yadanar			
Top 20	(Mandalay Region) Pyin Oo Lwin – Nway Nway Thu Aung			Top 10 Miss Supranational Myanmar 2026
Top 20	(Yangon Region) Thanlyin – Saw Yu Nwe Zin			

§ – Miss Shwe Nadi Shwe Yi

== Awards ==
=== Special awards ===
Award	Contestant
Miss Doctor Luxury Beauty	(Kayin State) Hpa-An – May Grace Parry
Best Hair Healthy by 808	(Rakhine State) Kyaukpyu – Thet Htar Shwe Sin
Miss 808	(Kayin State) Hpa-An – May Grace Parry
Miss Luna	(Kayin State) Hpa-An – May Grace Parry
Best in Evening Gown	(Yangon Region) Yangon West – Kyaw Kyaw Eaindra
Miss Congeniality	(Mandalay Region) Kyaukpadaung – Chuu
Best in Swimsuit	(Kachin State) Myitkyina – Mai Mai
Best National Costume	(Bago Region) Bago – Poe Pandra
Miss I'AURA	(Kayin State) Hpa-An – May Grace Parry

== Background ==
Miss Universe Myanmar 2026 was the first edition of the Miss Universe Myanmar pageant organized under national director Htoo Ant Lwin. The appointment marked a change in leadership for the national franchise, which had been overseen by the previous national director from 2013 to 2025.

== Contestants ==
A total of 38 contestants have been confirmed to participate in the pageant, each representing a locality.

Locality	Candidate	Age	Hometown	Notes
(Shan State) Aungban	Wint Shwe Yee Lin	21	Aung Ban	
(Bago Region) Bago	Poe Pandra	25	Yangon	Miss Universe Yangon East 2023
(Tanintharyi Region) Dawei	May Zin Aung	19	Dawei	
(Kayin State) Hpa-An	May Grace Parry	30	Yangon	
(Kachin State) Hpakant	Mona	24	Myitkyina	
(Shan State) Kalaw	Chue Thaw Tar	20	Yangon	
(Tanintharyi Region) Kawthaung	May Thazin Wint Htal	21	Yangon	
(Shan State) Kutkai	Saung Hnin Mone	19	Kutkai	
(Rakhine State) Kyaukpyu	Thet Htar Shwe Sin	19	Yangon	Miss Grand Myanmar 2024 finalist
(Mandalay Region) Kyaukpadaung	Chuu	30	Yangon	
(Mandalay Region) Kyaukse	Shin Min Wine	24	Yangon	
(Shan State) Kyaing Tong	Pan Ei Phyu	23	Yangon	
(Magway Region) Magway	Eaint Hmue Khin	19	Yangon	
(Mandalay Region) Mandalay	May Thitsar Khin	17	Mandalay	
(Ayeyarwady Region) Maubin	Nay Nadi Ko	17	Yangon	
(Mon State) Mawlamyine	Yoon Mi	23	Mawlamyine	
(Mandalay Region) Meiktila	Laung Laung	22	Meiktila	Miss Universe Myingyun 2025
(Shan State) Muse	Mwan Hom Aye	18	Muse	
(Kayin State) Myawaddy	San Yoon Nadi	20	Yangon	Miss Universe Pyay 2024
(Tanintharyi Region) Myeik	August Moe	29	Myeik	Miss Multinational Myanmar 2018
(Kachin State) Myitkyina	Mai Mai	23	Myitkyina	
Naypyidaw	Sitt Lon Yadanar	24	Naypyidaw	
(Shan State) Nyaungshwe	Rosy	22	Yangon	
(Magway Region) Pakokku	Yadanar Moe Aung	25	Yangon	
(Ayeyarwady Region) Pathein	Heather San	20	Yangon	
(Shan State) Pindaya	Angel Moe	17	Pindaya	
(Bago Region) Pyay	Linn Yati	22	Yangon	
Pyinmana	Khaing Zin Win	21	Naypyidaw	
(Mandalay Region) Pyin Oo Lwin	Nway Nway Thu Aung	20	Mandalay	Miss Supranational Myanmar 2026 Top 10
(Rakhine State) Sittwe	Saw La Pyae Won	24	Yangon	
(Shan State) Taunggyi	Naw MarNal LahBwe Khu	25	Yangon	Miss Galaxy Myanmar 2024
(Bago Region) Taungoo	Han Theint Theint Aung	20	Yangon	
(Yangon Region) Thanlyin	Saw Yu Nwe Zin	23	Yangon	
(Mandalay Region) Yamethin	Nan Akari	20	Yamethin	
(Yangon Region) Yangon East	Mon Daewi	22	Yangon	Miss Yangon 2025
(Yangon Region) Yangon North	Angel Kyi Phyu	24	Yangon	Miss Grand Myanmar 2024 2nd runner-up
(Yangon Region) Yangon South	Shwe Chue Ngone	25	Yangon	Miss Grand Myanmar 2024 Top 20
(Yangon Region) Yangon West	Kyaw Kyaw Eaindra	19	Yangon	Miss Grand Myanmar 2024 4th runner-up
