= Gae Gae =

Burmese singer (born 1991)

- ဂေဂေး
- Born: Phoo Pwint Moe; 1 August 1991 (age 34); Myanmar
- Occupation: Singer
- Height: 5 ft 3 in (160 cm)

Gae Gae (ဂေဂေး, b. 1 August 1991) is a Burmese singer. Her debut album, "Nin Thar Shi Yin", was released in 2015. She has released her second albrum Yainhkone lhoet mha hoteyaelarr in 2017.

== Discography ==
=== Solo albums ===
- Nin Thar Shi Yin (နင်သာရှိရင်) (2015)
- Yinhkone lhoet mha hoteyaelarr (ရင်ခုန်လို့မှဟုတ်ရဲ့လား) (2017)
- Friend (2019)

=== Duo albums ===
- Nar Mal Kyee (နာမည်ကြီး) 2019

== Personal life ==
She has been in a relationship with model Swe Zin Htet who was crowned Miss Universe Myanmar 2019.
