= Phyu Thi =

Burmese pop singer (born 1938)

Phyu Thi ဖြူသီ
- Born: 1938 (age 86–87); British Burma
- Origin: Burmese
- Genres: Pop
- Occupation: Singer
- Instrument: Voice
- Years active: 1980–present

Phyu Thi (Burmese: ဖြူသီ, born 1938) is a Burmese pop singer. Despite her prolific decades-long career, she performed in front of a live audience for the first time in 33 years, during her first concert in March 2013, at the National Theatre of Yangon. She has released 14 albums.

== Discography ==
- Mile Paung Kaday (မိုင်ပေါင်းကုဋေ) (1981)
- Annawar Chit Kha Yee (အဏ္ဏဝါချစ်ခရီး) (1981)
- A Chit Empire (အချစ်အင်ပါယာ) (1982)
- Pluto Hmar Hnit Yaut Tal (ပလူတိုမှာနှစ်ယောက်တည်း) (1983)
- Parami Phyae Phet (ပါရမီဖြည့်ဖက်) (1984)
- Hey (ဟေ့) (1985)
- Moe Nya Wingabar (မိုးညဝင်္ကပါ) (1986)
- Moe Nat Maung Shin (မိုးနတ်မောင်ရှင်) (1987)
