= Thuzar Wint Lwin =

Burmese model and beauty queen

- သူဇာဝင့်လွင်
- Born: Yangon, Myanmar
- Other name: Candy Thuzar
- Education: East Yangon University
- Occupations: Model; activist
- Height: 5 ft 7 in (170 cm)
- Beauty pageant titleholder
- Title: Miss Universe Myanmar 2020
- Major competitions: Miss Universe Hakha 2019 (winner); Miss Universe Myanmar 2020 (winner); Miss Universe 2020 (Top 21)(Best National Costume)

Thuzar Wint Lwin (Burmese: သူဇာဝင့်လွင်), also known as Candy Thuzar, is a Burmese activist and beauty pageant titleholder who was crowned Miss Universe Myanmar 2020. She represented Myanmar at Miss Universe 2020, where she reached the top 21 and won the Best National Costume award, becoming the first representative of Myanmar to place in the competition.

== Pageantry ==
=== Miss Universe Myanmar 2020 ===
On 30 December 2020, Thuzar Wint Lwin won Miss Universe Myanmar 2020 representing Hakha, Chin State, and was crowned by outgoing titleholder Swe Zin Htet. She also won Miss Healthy Skin, Miss Dentiste, and the Best in Evening Gown Awards.

=== Miss Universe 2020 ===
As Miss Universe Myanmar, Thuzar Wint Lwin received the right to represent Myanmar at Miss Universe 2020. Originally planned for winter 2020, the pageant was moved due to the COVID-19 pandemic to spring 2021, and held in Hollywood, Florida. Several months before the pageant was held, the 2021 Myanmar coup d'état occurred, which saw a military junta deposing the democratically elected National League for Democracy government and its leader Aung San Suu Kyi. Following this, Thuzar Wint Lwin began advocating for the Burmese pro-democracy movement. After arriving at the competition, Thuzar Wint Lwin's luggage was lost, including all of her outfits and her national costume. An alternate national costume was created within days by members of the Burmese American community, based on the ethnic costume of the Chin people. In the national costume contest, Thuzar Wint Lwin held a sign that read "Pray for Myanmar", referring to the coup, this attracted international media attention. She went on to win the Best National Costume award, the second time that Myanmar has won this award. Thuzar Wint Lwin later went on to place in the Top 21 of the competition, becoming the first Burmese representative to place at Miss Universe.

== Political activism ==
Immediately following the coup, Thuzar Wint Lwin became an activist for the Myanmar pro-democracy movement, through participating in rallies and social media activism. Thuzar Wint Lwin also became affiliated with the We Want Justice three-finger salute movement, which was launched on social media and saw several Burmese celebrities participating.

Following Miss Universe 2020, her arrest warrant was announced by the junta, and she was granted asylum in the United States, settling in Indianapolis, Indiana with the local Burmese American community. In August 2021, she moved to London after signing with a British modeling agency.

Awards and achievements
Preceded by (Philippines) Gazini Ganados	Miss Universe Best National Costume; 2020	Succeeded by (Nigeria) Maristella Okpala
Preceded by Swe Zin Htet Kayin State	Miss Universe Myanmar; 2020	Succeeded by Zar Li Moe Kayin State
