= Angel of Eden =

2016 Burmese film

- Film Poster
- Burmese: အေဒင်ရဲ့နတ်သမီး
- Directed by: Mee Pwar
- Screenplay by: Moe Ni Lwin
- Produced by: Mee Pwar; Sai Sai Kham Leng; Khin Sandar Myint
- Starring: Sai Sai Kham Leng; Paing Phyo Thu; Mari Cole; Wint Yamone Naing; May Grace Parry; Mya Hnin Yee Lwin
- Cinematography: Ko Ko; Thar Kyaw
- Edited by: Nyan Wint
- Music by: Sai Sai Kham Leng
- Production companies: Heart & Soul Picture; Frenzo Production
- Distributed by: Frenzo Production
- Release date: January 29, 2016 (Myanmar)
- Running time: 127 minutes
- Country: Myanmar
- Language: Burmese

Angel of Eden (Burmese: အေဒင်ရဲ့နတ်သမီး) is a 2016 Burmese legal-drama film, directed by Mee Pwar starring Sai Sai Kham Leng, Paing Phyo Thu, Mari Cole, Wint Yamone Naing, May Grace Parry and Mya Hnin Yee Lwin. (Note: Ref 4 is a summary of the plot of each character in Burmese language. Ref 7 is about the movie.) The film, produced by Heart & Soul Picture and Frenzo Production premiered in Myanmar on January 29, 2016.

== Cast ==
- Sai Sai Kham Leng as Eden
- Paing Phyo Thu as La Min Phyu
- Mari Cole as Nat Pan Chi
- Wint Yamone Naing as Pan Thit Khet, News Reporter
- May Grace Parry as Madi Pyo
- Mya Hnin Yee Lwin as Saung Hninsi, Lawyer
- Thar Nyi as Saw Thiha
- Nay Aung as U Hlaing Bwar
- San Htut as Paing Soe, Policeman
- Min Min Htun as Jeffery
