= Romy Simpkins =

British model

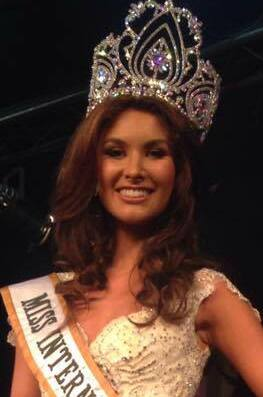
- Simpkins in 2016
- Born: Dorset, England
- Occupations: Actress; model
- Beauty pageant titleholder
- Title: Miss Dorset 2015; Miss Global International UK 2015; Miss International United Kingdom 2016; Miss Supranational England 2018
- Major competitions: Miss International United Kingdom 2016 (Winner); Miss International 2016 (Unplaced); Miss Supranational England 2018 (Winner); Miss Supranational 2018 (Unplaced); Miss Global 2026 (Top 25)

Romy Simpkins is an English actress, model, and beauty pageant titleholder who won Miss International United Kingdom 2016 and Miss Supranational England 2018.

== Pageantry ==
Romy Simpkins was a finalist at Miss Universe Great Britain 2012. She won Miss Dorset 2015, and then competed at Miss England 2015 final. She represented the UK at Miss Global International 2015 in Trinidad and Tobago, and reached the top 10, and won the Miss Photogenic award. He received the title of Miss International United Kingdom 2016 at the UK Power Pageant 2016. Simpkins was awarded a space in the grand final of Miss Universe Great Britain 2018.

== Television and modelling ==
Simpkins has appeared in television and film productions including series six of Dinner Date, and the film 'One Day'. Simpkins also appeared in the O2 "Whats my street age" advert on Facebook. In Australia, she was selected as 'Face of the Month' by the EMPV Model and Talent Management Company. Simpkins is also a part-time model, working in beauty, commercial and bridal. mental health ambassador

Awards and achievements
Preceded by Sophie Loudon	Miss United Kingdom; 2016	Succeeded by Ashley Powell

Awards and achievements
Preceded by	Miss Supranational England; 2018	Succeeded by
