= Pat Pat Sat Sat Nhyoe =

- Film poster
- Burmese: ပက်ပက်စက်စက်ညှို့
- Directed by: Thar Nyi
- Written by: Moe Ni Lwin
- Starring: Nay Toe; Moe Set Wine; Shwe Htoo
- Music by: Shwe Htoo, Wai Gyi
- Production company: 7th Sense Film Production
- Release date: 17 November 2017
- Running time: 120 minutes
- Country: Myanmar
- Language: Burmese

Pat Pat Sat Sat Nhyoe (Burmese: ပက်ပက်စက်စက်ညှို့ lit. Extreme Attraction) is a 2017 Burmese drama film starring Nay Toe, Moe Set Wine and Shwe Htoo. The film, produced by the 7th Sense Film Production, premiered in Myanmar on 17 November 2017.

== Cast ==
- Nay Toe as Paing Soe Naing
- Moe Set Wine as Hnin Pwint / Akari
- Shwe Htoo as Yarza Bwar
- Cho Pyone as Daw Nan Kyar Nyo
- Ye Aung as U Nay La
- Htoo Mon as Zay Ya Tu
