= Moe Set Wine =

Burmese model and beauty queen

- မိုးစက်ဝိုင်
- Born: Wai Wai Khine; 20 May 1988 (age 38); Yangon, Myanmar
- Education: BBA (Marketing); BA in English
- Occupations: Businesswoman model
- Height: 1.77 m (5 ft 10 in)
- Beauty pageant titleholder
- Title: Miss Universe Myanmar 2013
- Years active: 2013–present
- Hair color: Dark Brown
- Eye color: Black
- Major competitions: Miss Chinese Burma 2009 (1st Runner-up); Miss Universe Myanmar 2013 (Winner); Miss Universe 2013

Moe Set Wine (Burmese: မိုးစက်ဝိုင်, pronounced [mó zɛʔ wàiɴ], Chinese: 楊鑫榮; pinyin: Yáng Xīnróng; born Wai Wai Khine on 20 May 1988) is a Burmese model, actress and beauty pageant titleholder who won the Miss Universe Myanmar 2013 and represented Myanmar at the Miss Universe 2013 competition in Moscow on 9 November. She was the first woman to represent the country in the competition since 1961.

== Early life and education ==
Moe Set Wine was born in Yangon on 20 May 1988 to a Sino-Burmese father and Shan mother. She graduated from Dagon University with a degree in English. She later went on to pursue her undergraduate studies in the United States and graduated with a Bachelors of Arts degree in marketing from California Lutheran University.

== Competitions ==
In 2009, Moe Set Wine, using her Chinese name Yang Xinrong (楊鑫榮), went to compete and placed second in a Burmese Chinese beauty pageant held by a local newspaper, Golden Phoenix.

=== Miss Universe Myanmar 2013 ===
Moe Set Wine competed in Miss Universe Myanmar 2013, which was held on 3 October 2013 at the National Theatre in Yangon. The competition was organized by the Hello Madam Media Group. This competition was held for the first time since 1961. She won the Miss Perfect Skin and Miss Famous titles, voted for by fans through the Internet voting system and SMS messages. She became the winner of Miss Universe Myanmar 2013 after the competition.

== Acting career ==
She made her acting debut in the film Pat Pat Sat Sat Nhyoe, where she played the leading role alongside Nay Toe and Shwe Htoo in 2017. She then starred in her second film, Thetdi Shi Yin Laung Ma La alongside Pyay Ti Oo and Min Maw Kun, but the film has not yet been released. In 2020, she was cast in Star Less Sky. The film was a collaboration with Thailand and Japan, featuring Thai stars Phupoom Pongpanu, Parada Thitawachira, Korn Sirisorn, and Japanese stars Yasuyuki Maekawa, Koji Yano, and Emi Takei.

== Philanthropy ==
She founded a local charity organization named Myanmar's Heart on 9 January 2015. In 2019, she donated a water purifier that can be produced through air to a school in Tonzang through her charity organization, Myanmar's Heart.

== Business ==
Her family owns major business conglomerates in Myanmar, such as Green Circle Company, the producer of VeVe beverages in Myanmar, and National Paper Industry Co., Ltd. She serves as a director of that business. In 2018, she founded her own brand, MOEZY by Moesetwine, a skincare and cosmetic brand.

== Controversy ==
After Chinese news outlets revealed Moe Set Wine's participation in a local Burmese Chinese pageant, some netizens openly criticized her ancestry, questioning her citizenship status as well as whether a native-born Burmese of Chinese ancestry could represent Burma in pageants. A spokesperson for Hello Madam Media, which organized the 2013 Miss Universe Myanmar competition, stated that she holds Burmese citizenship, and that her parents, of Shan and Burmese descent, are from Namkham, in northern Shan State.

== Personal life ==
Moe Set Wine married Chit Oo Lwin, a businessman, on 6 June 2023.

Moe Set Wine's brother, Naing Phyo Kyaw, is married to Wutt Hmone Shwe Yi, an actress.

Awards and achievements
Preceded by Myint Myint Khin	Miss Universe Myanmar; 2013	Succeeded by Sharr Htut Eaindra
