= Zun Than Sin =

Burmese model

- ဇွန်သံစဉ်
- Born: Zun Than Sin; 26 June 1995 (age 31); Yangon, Myanmar
- Education: National University of Arts and Culture, Yangon
- Occupations: Model; Musician
- Height: 1.75 m (5 ft 9 in)
- Beauty pageant titleholder
- Title: Miss Universe Myanmar 2017
- Hair color: Black
- Eye color: Black
- Major competitions: Miss International Myanmar 2013 (1st runner up); Miss Universe Myanmar 2014 (Top 5); Asia New Star Model 2014 (B6 sense award winner); Luxury Brand Model Awards 2015 (Winner); Miss Universe Myanmar 2017 (Winner); Miss Universe 2017 (Unplaced)

Zun Than Sin (Burmese: ဇွန်သံစဉ်; born 26 June 1995) is a Burmese model, musician, and beauty pageant titleholder who was crowned Miss Universe Myanmar 2017 and represented Myanmar at the Miss Universe 2017 pageant.

== Early life ==
Zun was born and raised in Yangon to an ethnic Rakhine family. Her father is a head doctor from Yangon Ear Nose & Throat Hospital, while her mother is a housewife.

== Education ==
Zun graduated with double degrees in Burmese Literature and Dramatic Arts from National University of Arts and Culture in Yangon.

== Pageantry ==
=== Miss Universe Myanmar ===
Having previously competed in beauty pageants before, she was crowned as Miss Universe Myanmar 2017 on October 6, 2016, by outgoing titleholder Htet Htet Htun. She represented Myanmar at Miss Universe 2017.

=== Miss Universe 2017 ===
She competed at Miss Universe 2017 but Unplaced.

== Filmography ==
=== Television series ===
- Yadanarbon (2017)
- Pin Lal Gyi Yae A Pyone (2022)

Awards and achievements
Preceded by Htet Htet Htun	Miss Universe Myanmar; 2017	Succeeded by Hnin Thway Yu Aung
