= From Chao Phraya to Irrawaddy =

2022 Thai-Burmese television series

- Poster
- Thai: จากเจ้าพระยาสู่อิรวดี
- Burmese: ကျောက်ဖရားမှဧရာဝတီသို့
- Genre: Historical drama
- Screenplay by: Chatchai Katenut; Pimpanida Phanmai; Wanida Mongkolwit; Kanchanit Pantulee; May Myo Han
- Story by: Chatchai Katenut
- Directed by: Chatchai Katenut
- Starring: Jirayu Thantrakul; Tangtang Nutrugee Wisawanart; Daung; Hnin Thway Yu Aung
- Composers: Jetsada Hongcharoen; Numpark Sribanditmongkol; Chawin Temsittichok
- Countries of origin: Thailand; Myanmar
- Original languages: Thai; Burmese; English; Shan
- No. of episodes: 12

Production
- Producers: Kanokporn Dibakomuda; Varaporn Pibumrung
- Cinematography: Teerawat Rujinatham
- Editors: Surasak Panklin; Max Tersch; Chartchai Ketnust
- Running time: 50 minutes
- Production company: Magenta Media Creation

Original release
- Network: Thai PBS 3
- Release: January 1 – February 6, 2022

From Chao Phraya to Irrawaddy (Thai: จากเจ้าพระยาสู่อิรวดี; Burmese: ကျောက်ဖရားမှဧရာဝတီသို့) is a 2022 Thai-Burmese historical drama television series directed by Chatchai Katenut starring Thai actor Jirayu Thantrakul, Thai actress Tangtang Nattaruchi, Burmese actor Daung and Burmese actress Hnin Thway Yu Aung. It aired on Thai PBS 3, from January 1 to February 6, 2022, on every Saturday and Sunday at (THA) 20:15.

The series is based on the Burmese-Thai historical background of Konbaung dynasty and post-Ayutthaya Kingdom (Note: Ayutthaya Kingdom was overthrown in 1767 by King Hsinbyushin.) c. 1785. (Note: According to article of Myawaddy Mingyi U Sa, Maung Sa's wife Ma Aye died in 1785. Because Maung Sa said that his wife Ma Aye had died at the beginning of episode 2 of this series.) That was eighteen years after dissolution of Ayutthaya Kingdom, during the time of King Bodawpaya.

== Synopsis ==
Nutchanat (Tangtang Nattaruchi) got a job as an assistant chef at a prestigious hotel in downtown Yangon and met her new friend, Zin Zin (Hnin Thway Yu Aung) and the Executive Chef, Pakorn (Jirayu Thantrakul). One day, Nutchanat got a book Enaung (the Panji tales in Burmese) from old bookshop and she dances like the one in the book, then she dreamed that she was in the Ava Palace over two hundred years in Burma, she met Princess Kunthon and Princess Mongkut, two princesses who were forcibly taken from Ayutthaya. She said her name was "Pin." Maung Sa (Daung), a leading artist in Burmese royal drama, took her for a dance.

== Cast ==
- Jirayu Thantrakul as Pakorn / Bagong
- Tangtang Nutrugee Wisawanart as Nutchanat / Pin
- Daung as Maung Sa
- Hnin Thway Yu Aung as Zin Zin / Consort Mala
- Thanavate Siriwattanakul as Shwedaung Min
- Penpak Sirikul as Princess Kunthon
- Duangjai Hiransri as Princess Mongkut
- Kowit Wattanakul as U Htay Shwe / King Bodawpaya
- Sumontha Suanpholaat as Chut

== Episodes ==
No.	Directed by	Written by	Original release date
1	Chatchai Katenut	Chatchai Katenut, Pimpanida Phanmai, Wanida Mongkolwit, Kanchanit Pantulee and May Myo Han	January 1, 2022
Nutchanat got a job as an assistant chef at a famous hotel cooking school. She worked with the savvy executive chef Pakorn, who is also Thai, but never compromised. Ready to radiate savage radiation on her at all times. She also met with rumors that the hotel was about to be taken over in the hands of Burma's billionaire U Htay Shwe. But she was fortunate to have a new friend like Zin Zin who helped her stay in Yangon with peace of mind until she went for a walk on Pansodan Road and got back the Burmese version of the Enao book. Letting go of the feeling with the dance moves in that book causing her to slip into a strange, ancient world.
2	Chatchai Katenut	Chatchai Katenut, Pimpanida Phanmai, Wanida Mongkolwit, Kanchanit Pantulee and May Myo Han	January 2, 2022
In 1785, Maung Sa met Nang Pin dancing at the edge of the forest and was very impressed. One day, Nang Pin, who was pregnant, worked so hard that she bled. Maung Sa saved her and made her stay at his home. When Nang Pin's condition improved, danced to the sound of Maung Sa's harp but that made her condition worse and worse. In modern times, U Htay Shwe come to the hotel and calls for Mohinga dishes but he can't satisfy these. This made him think of closing the cooking school, which made Pakorn extremely troubled. At the same time, he realized that Nutchanat did not come to work and could not contact him and Zin Zin, so he rushed to Nutchanat's room and he found her lying unconscious in the middle of the room. He rushed her to the hospital.
3	Chatchai Katenut	Chatchai Katenut, Pimpanida Phanmai, Wanida Mongkolwit, Kanchanit Pantulee and May Myo Han	January 8, 2022
Nutchanat began to worry because the brain scan results showed that nerve compression tumor memory control. After returning to the room, she thought to the past journey. But then she was confused if it was a reality or a dream. Later, Pakorn called Nutchanat to visit to Pyapon with him to find the Mohinga formula that would win the heart of U Htay Shwe.
4	Chatchai Katenut	Chatchai Katenut, Pimpanida Phanmai, Wanida Mongkolwit, Kanchanit Pantulee and May Myo Han	January 9, 2022
Nutchanat revived in Pin's body again. Maung Sa asked Pin to become a dancer at the Royal Theater and translate the Enao play into Burmese. Princess Kunthon allowed Pin to join the troupe but refused to translate Enao. Later, Princess Mongkut secretly handed over Enao to Maung Sa. Pakorn said that "she was unconscious for a few seconds". Nutchanat said that "it was impossible, she reached to the past for a long time".
5	Chatchai Katenut	Chatchai Katenut, Pimpanida Phanmai, Wanida Mongkolwit, Kanchanit Pantulee and May Myo Han	January 15, 2022
Nutchanat who succeeded in conquering the heart of U Htay Shwe. Pakorn decided to share his feelings with Nutchanat and went to visit Maha Thein Daw Gyi Temple together. But that turned out to be the day when the two broke up because Pakorn wanted to emphasize that Nutchanat's time travel to the pass had never happened. It wasn't long before they could understand each other more, Nutchanat lost consciousness.
6	Chatchai Katenut	Chatchai Katenut, Pimpanida Phanmai, Wanida Mongkolwit, Kanchanit Pantulee and May Myo Han	January 16, 2022
Nutchanat wakes up again in the middle of the Royal Theater. Bagong's mother accused her of intentionally miscarried her pregnancy with Bagong and having an affair with Maung Sa, but Maung Sa was able to control the situation. Nutchanat was confused by the whole story. As she wakes up again in Bangkok with Pakorn to take care of her as well Doctors found that she had a cerebral hyperhidrosis. But Nutchanat still insists on not having surgery. Then her condition worsened to the point of falling asleep for a long time.
7	Chatchai Katenut	Chatchai Katenut, Pimpanida Phanmai, Wanida Mongkolwit, Kanchanit Pantulee and May Myo Han	January 22, 2022
Princess Kunthon allowed Maung Sa to perform Adonis to welcome the royal troops after watching Pin's rehearsal on the day of the pin show. It was so impressive that Shwedaung Min admired the Royal Theater Company very much and in that performance there was a concubine to watch as well. After the show ended, Bagong, who looks like Pakorn without any distortion, came to Pin at the dressing room, causing Nutchanat in Pin figure to be very shocked and confused.
8	Chatchai Katenut	Chatchai Katenut, Pimpanida Phanmai, Wanida Mongkolwit, Kanchanit Pantulee and May Myo Han	January 23, 2022
Bagong came to Pin at the kitchen and found that Pin was not there, and then followed him to the Royal Theater but was trapped on the way Nutchanat didn't know how to explain to Bagong that she was another woman who came in the body of Pin. At the same time as in today's world Nutchanat was brought back to Thailand for treatment, with Pakorn closely following her.
9	Chatchai Katenut	Chatchai Katenut, Pimpanida Phanmai, Wanida Mongkolwit, Kanchanit Pantulee and May Myo Han	January 29, 2022
Nutchanat wakes up again in the form of Nang Pin. She was in a very confused state. But before things got worse, she met Bagong again and the two reconciled. But when Nuchnat returned to rehearsal for the performance, it was found that Viceroy had ordered to perform a performance from Ramayana as a tool to support the Nine Armies War. While Nutchanat was still skeptical about the show. She has to face new problems from her dance partner.
10	Chatchai Katenut	Chatchai Katenut, Pimpanida Phanmai, Wanida Mongkolwit, Kanchanit Pantulee and May Myo Han	January 30, 2022
The story that happened in the Royal Theater was told to Viceroy, causing Consort Mala and Nutchanat in Nang Pin's body to be called to interrogate at the royal theater together. But the story turned into chaos. When the rumors that Nutchanat was a witch, a sorcerer came up and spoke again. King Bodawpaya therefore challenged him to predict the future of the country. But when they know the answer Nutchanat's fate has changed forever.
11	Chatchai Katenut	Chatchai Katenut, Pimpanida Phanmai, Wanida Mongkolwit, Kanchanit Pantulee and May Myo Han	February 5, 2022
Nutchanat, in the form of Nang Pin, mourns her death and wants to be in prison. She faced Consort Mala again, but nothing seemed to improve.while Bagong and Maung Sa gathered their courage to meet Viceroy to ask for a pardon for Pin. In the end, Bagong kept writing and calculating the auspicious time with stress as if planning a big idea.
12	Chatchai Katenut	Chatchai Katenut, Pimpanida Phanmai, Wanida Mongkolwit, Kanchanit Pantulee and May Myo Han	February 6, 2022
Viceroy is still disappointed with Bagong , a close soldier who trusted and risked his life together. But the fate of a servant like Bagong and Nutchanat in the form of Nang Pin will it change the heart of the landlord? In the meantime, Maung Sa rushes to Nutchanat in prison to bid farewell. But Nutchanat asked to hold the performance that he had rehearsed together again and this performance will be held in the presence of King Bodawpaya.

== Awards ==
Year	Award	Category	Nominee	Result
2023	Nine Entertain Awards	Best Creative Team of the Year	Drama Information Team From Chao Phraya to Irrawaddy	Won
2023	Nine Entertain Awards	Best TV Drama of the Year	From Chao Phraya to Irrawaddy	Won
