= Swe Zin Htet =

Burmese model and beauty queen

- ဆွေဇင်ထက်
- Born: 16 November 1998 (age 27); Hpa-an, Myanmar
- Beauty pageant titleholder
- Title: Miss Supranational Myanmar 2016; Miss Universe Myanmar 2019
- Hair color: Black
- Eye color: Brown
- Major competitions: Miss Supranational 2016 (Top 8); Miss Universe Hpa-An 2019 (Winner); Miss Universe Myanmar 2019 (Winner); Miss Universe 2019 (Unplaced)

Swe Zin Htet (Burmese: ဆွေဇင်ထက်; born 16 November 1998) is a Burmese model and beauty pageant titleholder who was crowned Miss Universe Myanmar 2019.

In November 2019, Swe Zin Htet came out as a lesbian, and later that year she became the first openly lesbian woman to compete in a Miss Universe competition. Julia Lemigova of the Soviet Union competed in Miss Universe 1991, Patricia Yurena Rodríguez of Spain competed in the Miss Universe 2013 competition, and Mariana Varela of Argentina competed in Miss Universe 2019 with Htet, but they did not come out until after their respective competitions.

== Pageantry ==
=== Miss Supranational Myanmar ===
Swe Zin Htet begun her pageantry career after winning Miss Supranational Myanmar 2016

=== Miss Supranational ===
she placed in the top ten and won Miss Personality title at Miss Supranational 2016.

=== Miss Universe Myanmar ===
On May 31, 2019, Swe Zin Htet was crowned as Miss Universe Myanmar 2019 by previous titleholder Hnin Thway Yu Aung. She will be Myanmar's next representative to Miss Universe.

=== Miss Universe 2019 ===
As Miss Universe Myanmar, she represented Myanmar in the Miss Universe 2019 competition. At the end of event, she was unplaced.

== Personal life ==
She has been in a relationship with singer Gae Gae.

Awards and achievements
Preceded by Myint-Mo May	Miss Universe Hpa-An; 2019	Succeeded by Phyu Thant Chaw
Preceded by Hnin Thway Yu Aung	Miss Universe Myanmar; 2019	Succeeded by Thuzar Wint Lwin
