= May Grace Parry =

Burmese and Australian actress, model, and beauty pageant titleholder

- မေဂရေ့စ်ပယ်ရီ
- Born: 2 May 1995 (age 31); Dhaka, Bangladesh
- Education: University of Melbourne
- Occupations: Actress; model
- Beauty pageant titleholder
- Title: Miss Universe Hpa-an 2026; Miss Universe Myanmar 2026
- Years active: 2010–present
- Major competitions: Miss Universe Myanmar 2026; (Winner); Miss Universe 2026; (TBD)

May Grace Parry (Burmese: မေဂရေ့စ်ပယ်ရီ; born 2 May 1995) is a Burmese and Australian actress, model, and beauty pageant titleholder who won Miss Universe Myanmar 2026. Parry worked as a model and actor, before pageantry.

== Early life and education ==
May Grace Parry was born on 2 May 1995 in Dhaka, Bangladesh to an Australian and Burmese family. She became a fashion model at the age of 15. She studied Media and Communication with a minor in Film Studies at the University of Melbourne.

== Career ==
=== Modeling and acting ===
Parry began as a commercial model for local brands in 2015. In 2016, she made her acting debut in the film Angel of Eden. In 2018, she won the Myanmar Model Star award at the Asia Model Festival, held in South Korea.

=== Pageantry ===
Parry won Miss Universe Myanmar 2026 representing Hpa-an, on 17 June 2026 at the Hexagon Complex in Yangon. She will represent Myanmar at Miss Universe 2026.

Awards and achievements
Preceded by Myat Yadanar Soe (Pyin Oo Lwin)	Miss Universe Myanmar; 2026	Incumbent
