= Hnin Thway Yu Aung =

Burmese model

- နှင်းသွေးယုအောင်
- Born: Hnin Thway Yu Aung; 24 August 1996 (age 30); Tachileik, Shan State, Myanmar
- Height: 1.65 m (5 ft 5 in)
- Beauty pageant titleholder
- Title: Miss Universe Myanmar 2018
- Hair color: Black
- Eye color: Dark Brown
- Major competitions: Miss Universe Myanmar 2018 (Winner); Miss Universe 2018 (Unplaced)

Hnin Thway Yu Aung (Burmese: နှင်းသွေးယုအောင်; born 24 August 1996) is a Burmese model and beauty pageant titleholder who won the 5th edition of Miss Universe Myanmar in 2018. She represented her country Myanmar in the Miss Universe 2018.

== Early life ==
Hnin Thway Yu Aung, was born on 24 August 1996 in Meiktila, Mandalay, Myanmar as where her parents met and established an optic shop in the downtown area of Tachileik. She received her high school Diploma from Basic Education High School (1) - Tachileik, she graduated from Kyaing Tung University with a bachelor's degree in English. She can speak Burmese, English, Thai and Shan.

== Pageantry ==
=== Miss Universe Myanmar ===
On 1 October 2017, Hnin Thway Yu Aung was crowned as Miss Universe Myanmar 2018 by previous titleholder Zun Than Sin. She will be Myanmar's next representative to Miss Universe.

=== Miss Universe 2018 ===
She represented her country in the Miss Universe 2018 where Demi-Leigh Nel-Peters of South Africa crowned her successor Catriona Gray of the Philippines at the end of the event.

== Filmography ==
Hhnin Thway Yu Aung played the role of Zin Zin / Consort Mala, Consort of King Bodawpaya in From Chao Phraya to Irrawaddy (ကျောက်ဖရားမှဧရာဝတီသို့) (2022) which increased attention and popularity with this role.

== Political activities ==
Following the 2021 Myanmar coup d'état, Hnin Thway Yu Aung was active in the anti-coup movement through social media. She has been in Thailand since December for the filming of From Chao Phraya to Irrawaddy. She spoke to Thai media about the current situation in Myanmar. She joined the "We Want Justice" three-finger salute movement. The movement was launched on social media, and many celebrities have joined the movement. She sold her crown for 45 lakh Burmese Kyats to donate to the Pyidaungsu Hluttaw Representative Committee (CRPH) fund.

On 3 April 2021, warrants for her arrest were issued under section 505 (a) of the penal code by the State Administration Council for speaking out against the military coup. Along with several other celebrities, she was charged with calling for participation in the Civil Disobedience Movement (CDM) and damaging the state's ability to govern, with supporting the Committee Representing Pyidaungsu Hluttaw, and with generally inciting the people to disturb the peace and stability of the nation.

Awards and achievements
Preceded by Zun Than Sin	Miss Universe Myanmar; 2018	Succeeded by Swe Zin Htet
