= Sharr Htut Eaindra =

Burmese model and beauty queen

- သျှားထွဋ်အိန္ဒြာ
- Born: 21 March 1994 (age 32); Yangon, Myanmar
- Education: philosophy in Dagon University
- Occupation: model
- Height: 1.71 m (5 ft 7 in)
- Beauty pageant titleholder
- Title: Miss Universe Myanmar 2014
- Years active: 2014–present
- Hair color: Dark Brown
- Eye color: Black
- Major competitions: Miss Universe Myanmar 2014 (Winner); Miss Universe 2014

Sharr Htut Eaindra (Burmese: သျှားထွဋ်အိန္ဒြာ, pronounced [ʃá tʰʊʔ ʔèiɴdɹà]; born 21 March 1994) is a Burmese model and beauty pageant titleholder who won the Miss Universe Myanmar 2014 and represented Myanmar at Miss Universe 2014.

== Pageantry ==
=== Miss Mega Expo 2013 ===
Before competing at Miss Universe Myanmar 2014, she was placed the 2nd Runner-up at Mega Expo 2013, and represented Myanmar at 2013 Southeast Asian Games in the Burmese traditional costume.

=== Miss Universe Myanmar 2014 ===
She was crowned Miss Universe Myanmar 2014 on 26 July 2014. She was crowned together with runners-up, Yoon Mhi Mhi Kyaw and Shwe Sin Ko Ko.

=== Miss Universe 2014 ===
Sharr competed at Miss Universe 2014 but was unplaced.

Awards and achievements
Preceded by Moe Set Wine	Miss Universe Myanmar; 2014	Succeeded by May Barani Thaw
