= Miss Global 2026 =

11th Miss Global beauty pageant

- Date: 11 October 2026
- Venue: MCC Hall, The Mall Lifestore Ngamwongwan, Nonthaburi, Thailand
- Placements: 25
- Winner: Saffron Snook; Thailand

Miss Global 2026 was 11th Miss Global pageant, held at the MCC Hall, The Mall Lifestore Ngamwongwan in Nonthaburi, Thailand, on 11 October 2026.

Saffron Snook of Thailand was crowned Miss Global 2026.

== Background ==
=== Location and date ===
In 2026, Thailand was selected as the host country for Miss Global 2026, which is scheduled to be held from 29 September to 11 October. The contest will be held jointly with Mister Global 2026 under the organization of TPN Global, for the first time.

=== Replacements ===
Nayäti Filatre of Martinique, and Shiksha Matabul of Mauritius, were replaced by Wyde Cadrot, and Divya Ramdewar, respectively. Contreras was subsequently replaced by Ana Lucía Soto. Valerie West of the Philippines resigned from her title and was replaced by Jayvee Lorejo, while Thúy Hằng Kiều of Vietnam withdrew for health reasons and was replaced by Huyền Trang Trần. Erina Yousry of Egypt was replaced by Rawan Hamid.

== Results ==
=== Placements ===
Placement	Contestant
Miss Global 2026	Thailand – Saffron Snook
1st Runner-Up	United States – Kelly Kirstein
2nd Runner-Up	Puerto Rico – Bianca Caraballo
3rd Runner-Up	Philippines – Jayvee Lorejo
4th Runner-Up	Myanmar – Kyaw Kyaw Eaindra
Top 12	Colombia – Nicolle Torres; Dominican Republic – Yeimi Hernández; Persia – Hadis Sattari ‡; South Africa – Chanel Rautenbach; Spain – Irene Cabrera; Tanzania – Rose Uisso; Venezuela – Frannia Ybirmas
Top 25	Australia – Kymberlee Street; Brazil – Giovanna Starling; Canada – Jacklynn Bowdery; Canary Islands – Sara Cicero; Ecuador – Alejandra García; England – Romy Simpkins; Honduras – Brittany Boltinhouse; India – Shemonyl Wankadia; Indonesia – Angela Lillo; Japan – Aurora Imamoto; Luxembourg – Suzy Pemmers; Mexico – Maribel Ojeda; Nigeria – Aisha Abubakar; Samoa – Farani Faalagilagi

‡ – Voted into Top 12 via Miss People's Choice

== Contestants ==
The confirmed contestants are as follows:

Country/Territory	Contestant	Age (Note: Ages at the time of the pageant)	Hometown	Ref.
Argentina	Ashley Sierra	22	Buenos Aires	
Australia	Kymberlee Street	28	Sydney	
Bahamas	Nyisha Tilus	31	Abaco	
Belarus	Tatyana Marchuk	20	Mozyr	
Belgium	Luna Dupont	19	Izegem	
Brazil	Giovanna Starling	22	Belo Horizonte	
Buryatia	Daria Burdukovskaia	19	Ulan-Ude	
Canada	Jacklynn Bowdery	22	Duncan	
Canary Islands	Sara Cicero	20	Gran Canaria	
China	Mina Aierken	24	Xinjiang	
Colombia	Nicolle Torres	19	Cartagena	
Costa Rica	Michelle Soto	23	Alajuela	
Cuba	Ashlee Méndez	21	Miami	
Czech Republic	Aneta Růžičková	20	Prague	
Dominican Republic	Yeimi Hernández	27	Santo Domingo	
Ecuador	Alejandra García	22	Portoviejo	
Egypt	Rawan Hamid	–	–	
El Salvador	Jaquelyne Guevara	25	San Salvador	
England	Romy Simpkins	33	Bournemouth	
Estonia	Elena Haakana	22	Tallinn	
Ethiopia	Wintana Bayou	25	Addis Ababa	
Finland	Felicia Muyima	27	Helsinki	
Germany	Alexandra Blank	34	Regensburg	
Greece	Ioanna Skoula	21	Heraklion	
Guatemala	Ana Lucía Soto	24	Antigua Guatemala	
Guinea	Fatoumata Baldé	23	Conakry	
Hmong	Yang Youa Vang	21	Saint Paul	
Honduras	Brittany Boltinhouse	22	Tegucigalpa	
Hong Kong	Lin Lei	18	Hong Kong	
India	Shemonyl Wankadia	24	Mumbai	
Indonesia	Angela Lillo	27	Riau Islands	
Israel	Michal Yefedov	21	Ashdod	
Jamaica	Deidrian Downer	26	Mandeville	
Japan	Aurora Imamoto	24	Tokyo	
Kazakhstan	Diana Nyssangaliyeva	23	Almaty	
Kosovo	Ketrina Gashi	24	Pristina	
Latvia	Samanta Ribule	24	Riga	
Lithuania	Laurita Kapačinskaitė	23	Šiauliai	
Luxembourg	Suzy Pemmers	25	Luxembourg	
Macau	Lin Zhong	21	Macau	
Malaysia	Shewon Loo	25	Kuala Lumpur	
Martinique	Wyde Cadrot	32	Fort-de-France	
Mauritius	Divya Ramdewar	26	Port Louis	
Mexico	Maribel Ojeda	26	Sinaloa	
Mongolia	Azzaya Burmaa	18	Ulaanbaatar	
Morocco	Roufaida Kadim	24	Copenhagen	
Myanmar	Kyaw Kyaw Eaindra	19	Yangon	
Nepal	Khushi Bohara	21	Kathmandu	
Netherlands	Milou Bleker	23	Stadskanaal	
New Zealand	Shae Parsons	23	Auckland	
Nigeria	Aisha Abubakar	25	Nasarawa	
Northern Ireland	Casiana Alina	25	Ballymena	
Persia	Hadis Sattari	25	Tehran	
Peru	Renata Barón	25	Lima	
Philippines	Jayvee Lorejo	25	Mawab	
Portugal	Tatiana Ramos	24	Porto	
Puerto Rico	Bianca Caraballo	24	Guayanilla	
Samoa	Farani Faalagilagi	32	Apia	
Slovakia	Adriana Molnárová	28	Bratislava	
South Africa	Chanel Rautenbach	21	Vanderbijlpark	
Spain	Irene Cabrera	22	Madrid	
Sri Lanka	Vonara Wickramasinghe	22	Colombo	
Taiwan	Oceana Ling-Kurie	26	Taipei	
Tanzania	Rose Uisso	23	Dar es Salaam	
Thailand	Saffron Snook	24	Bangkok	
Timor-Leste	Celia Bosco	21	Lospalos	
Togo	Karen Chalom	20	Kpalimé	
Turkey	Gina Samat	38	Trelleborg	
United States	Kelly Kirstein	37	Mount Clemens	
Venezuela	Frannia Ybirmas	23	Caracas	
Vietnam	Huyền Trang Trần	28	Quảng Ngãi	
Zimbabwe	Nomqhele Nkomo	22	Bulawayo	

=== Withdrawals ===
South Korea Park Miso - She did not appear in the final competition.
