= Hlaingbwe =

- Town
- Location in Myanmar (Burma)
- Coordinates: 17°8′N 97°50′E
- Country: Myanmar
- Division: Kayin State
- District: Hpa-an District
- Township: Hlaignbwe Township
- Elevation: 56 ft (17 m)

Population (2014)
  - Total: 11,511
  - Religions: Buddhism; Christianity
- Time zone: UTC+6.30 (MMT)
- Area code: 58

Hlaingbwe (Burmese: လှိုင်းဘွဲ့; Pwo Karen: ဍုံပါ်စံင်; S'gaw Karen: လူၢ်ပျဲၢ်; Mon: လိုၚ်ဗၠဲ [làŋ plòa]) is a town in Kayin State, Myanmar. The Hlaingbwe River runs from north to south through the town. Most residents are from the Karen ethnic group.
