= Shwegu =

Shwegu ရွှေကူမြို့
- Town
- Shweku
- Location in Burma
- Coordinates: 24°13′0″N 96°48′0″E
- Country: Myanmar
- Division: Kachin State
- District: Bhamo District
- Township: Shwegu Township

Population (2005)
  - Religions: Buddhism
- Time zone: UTC+6.30 (MST)

Shwegu (Burmese: ရွှေကူမြို့) is a town in the Kachin State of northernmost part of the Myanmar (Burma).
