= Myeik Township =

- Township
- Location in Myeik district

- Location in Burma
- Coordinates: 12°26′N 98°36′E
- Country: Burma
- Region: Taninthayi Region
- District: Myeik District
- Capital: Myeik

Area
  - Total: 1,417.9 km^{2} (547.5 sq mi)

Population (2014)
  - Total: 284,489
  - Density: 200.64/km^{2} (519.66/sq mi)
- Time zone: UTC+6.30 (MST)

Myeik Township (Burmese: မြိတ်မြို့နယ်) is a township of Myeik District in the Taninthayi Division of Myanmar. The principal town is Myeik.

== Demographics ==
=== 2014 ===
Historical Population
Year	Pop.	±%
1983	170,451	—
2014	284,489	+66.9%

The 2014 Myanmar Census reported that Myeik Township had a population of 284,489. The population density was 200.6 people per km^{2}. The census reported that the median age was 24.5 years, and a sex ratio of 96 males per 100 females. There were 54,349 households; the mean household size was 5.0.
