= National Theatre of Yangon =

Myanmar's national theatre

- အမျိုးသားဇာတ်ရုံ
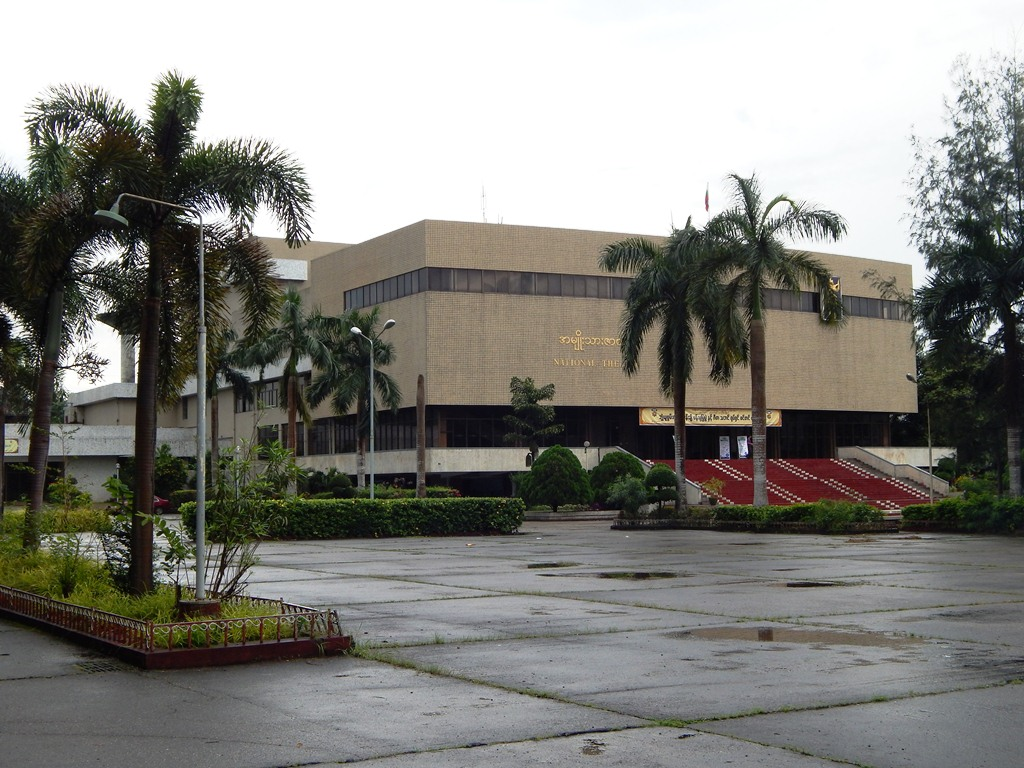
- Interactive map of National Theatre of Yangon
- Address: Myoma Kyaung Street; Yangon; Myanmar
- Coordinates: 16.7839°N 96.1493°E
- Type: National theatre

Construction
- Opened: 1991

The National Theatre of Yangon (Burmese: အမျိုးသားဇာတ်ရုံ), located in Yangon, is a national theatre of Myanmar. The theatre is used for cultural exchange programs with foreign countries, for departmental workshops, religious ceremonies, prize giving ceremonies, performing arts competitions, and for musical stage shows.

== History ==
The theater was constructed with aid from People's Republic of China. Construction began on 3 June 1987 and completed on 30 January 1991. Of the total cost of 215.47 million kyats, the Chinese government contributed 150 million kyats and the Burmese side contributed the remainder.

== Beauty pageants ==
- Miss Universe Myanmar 2013 - October 3, 2013
- Miss Universe Myanmar 2014 - July 26, 2014
- Mister International 2017 - April 30, 2018

== Images ==
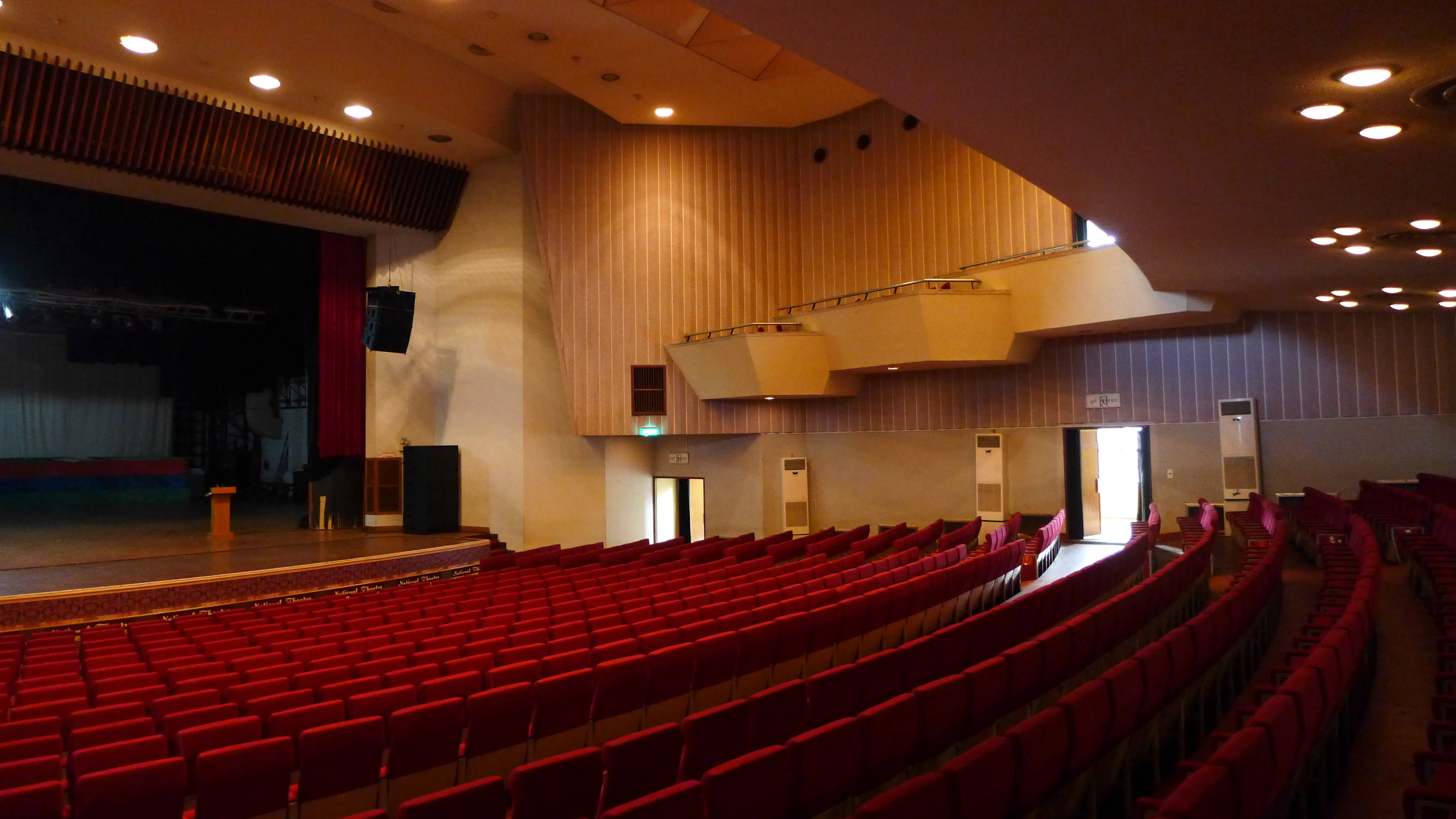
Hall of National Theatre of Yangon.

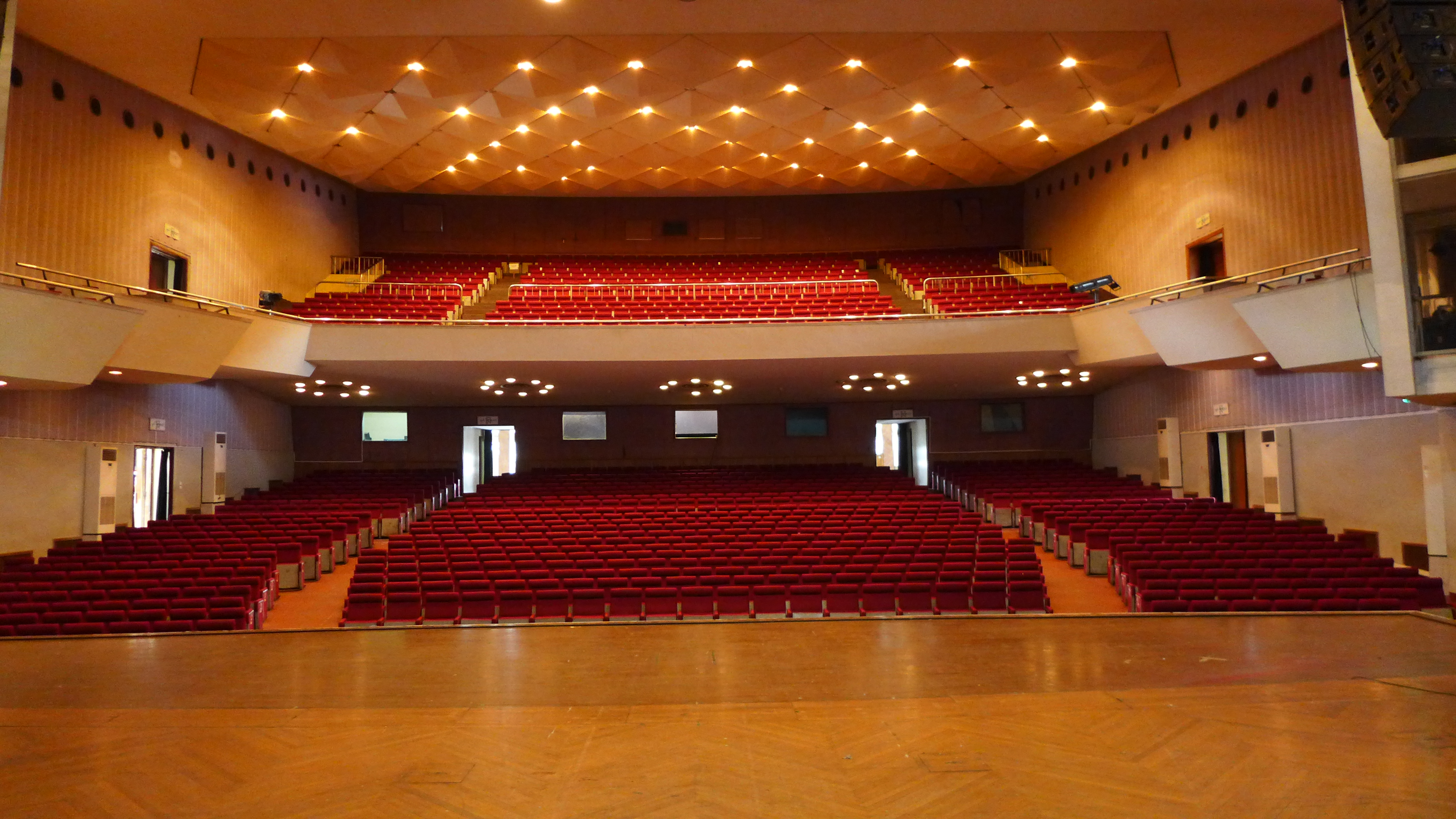
Hall of National Theatre of Yangon seen from stage.

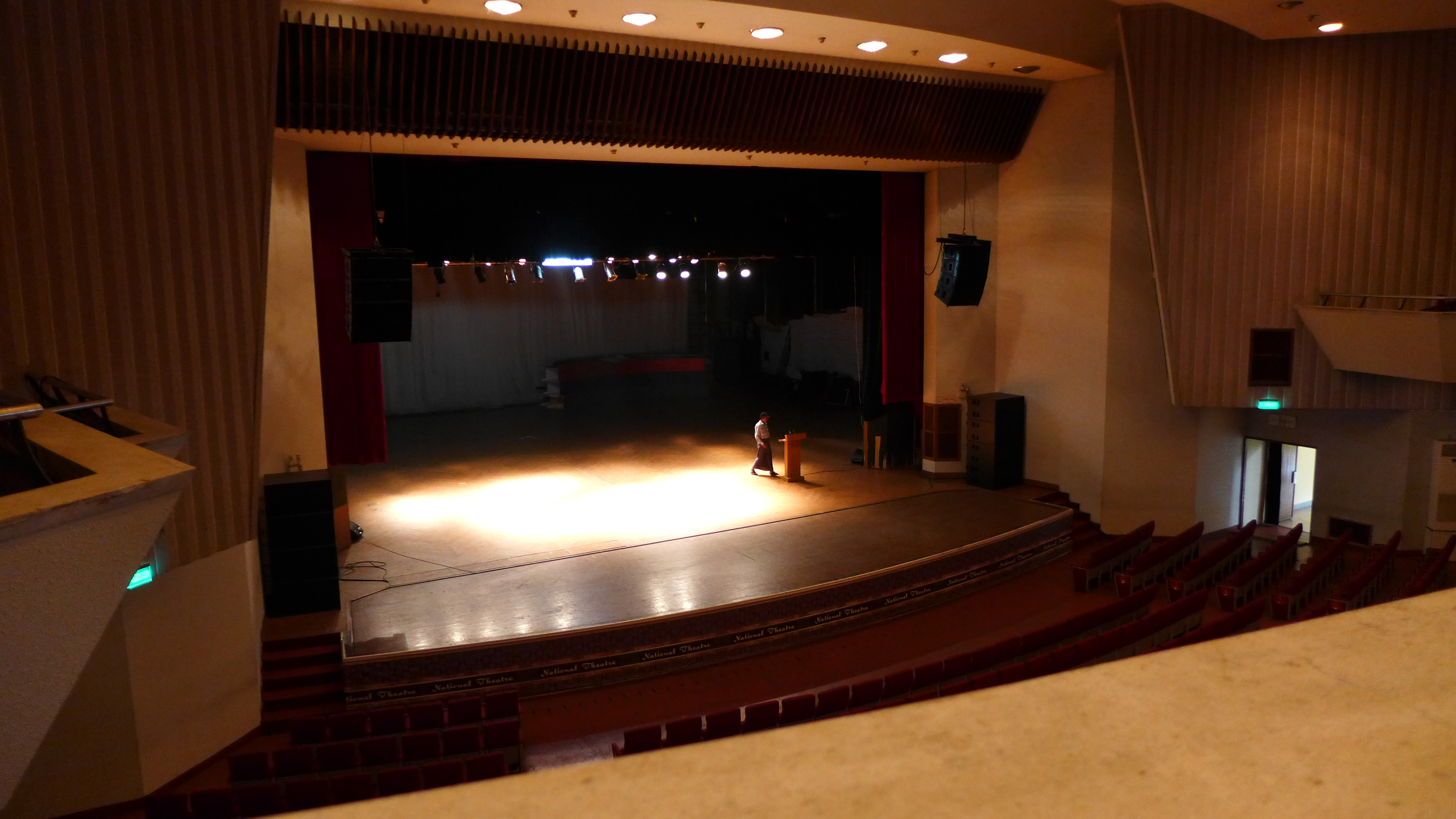
Stage of National Theatre of Yangon seen from gallery.

== See also ==
- National Theatre of Mandalay
