= Minbu =

Minbu မင်းဘူး
- City
- Location in Burma
- Coordinates: 21°10′29.73″N 94°52′55.18″E
- Country: Myanmar
- Division: Magway Region
- District: Minbu District
- Township: Minbu Township

Population (2014)
  - Urban: 22,962
  - Religions: Buddhism
- Time zone: UTC+6.30 (MST)

Minbu (Burmese: မင်းဘူးမြို့) is a city in Magwe Division, Myanmar. As of 2026, the city has an urban population of 26,911. The area consists of low plain-land towards the Ayeyarwady River, and of undulating country inland rising higher and higher westwards towards the Arakan Mountains. Between the plain and the Arakan Yoma range is a distinct line of hills running north and south, and usually called the Nwa-Madaung hills. The chief streams besides the Ayeyarwady are the Mon, the Maw, and the Salin, which are largely used for irrigation. At Minbu the Ayeyarwady is 3 miles (4.8 km) wide, with many islands and sandbanks. There are considerable fisheries along the Ayeyarwady and on the Paunglin Lake, which is a lagoon fed from the Ayeyarwady. Oil has been discovered near the mud volcanoes of Minbu, but it seems to lie at too great a depth to be profitably worked.

There is a large area of reserved forest near Minbu. The chief crops raised are rice, gram, millet, beans, peas, sesamum and tobacco. The betel-vine is largely cultivated along the Mon River. The annual rainfall varies greatly in the area. It is very considerable on and under the Arakari Yomas, and very slight towards the Ayeyarwady. The temperature rises to over 100 °F (38 °C) in the hot months, and the mean of minimum in December is about 49 °F (9 °C).

== Points of interest ==
- Shin Min Selinte Pagoda Agoda
- Naga Pwet Hill (Mud Volcano)
- Mann Shwe Settaw Pagoda

=== Minbu Shwe Settaw ===
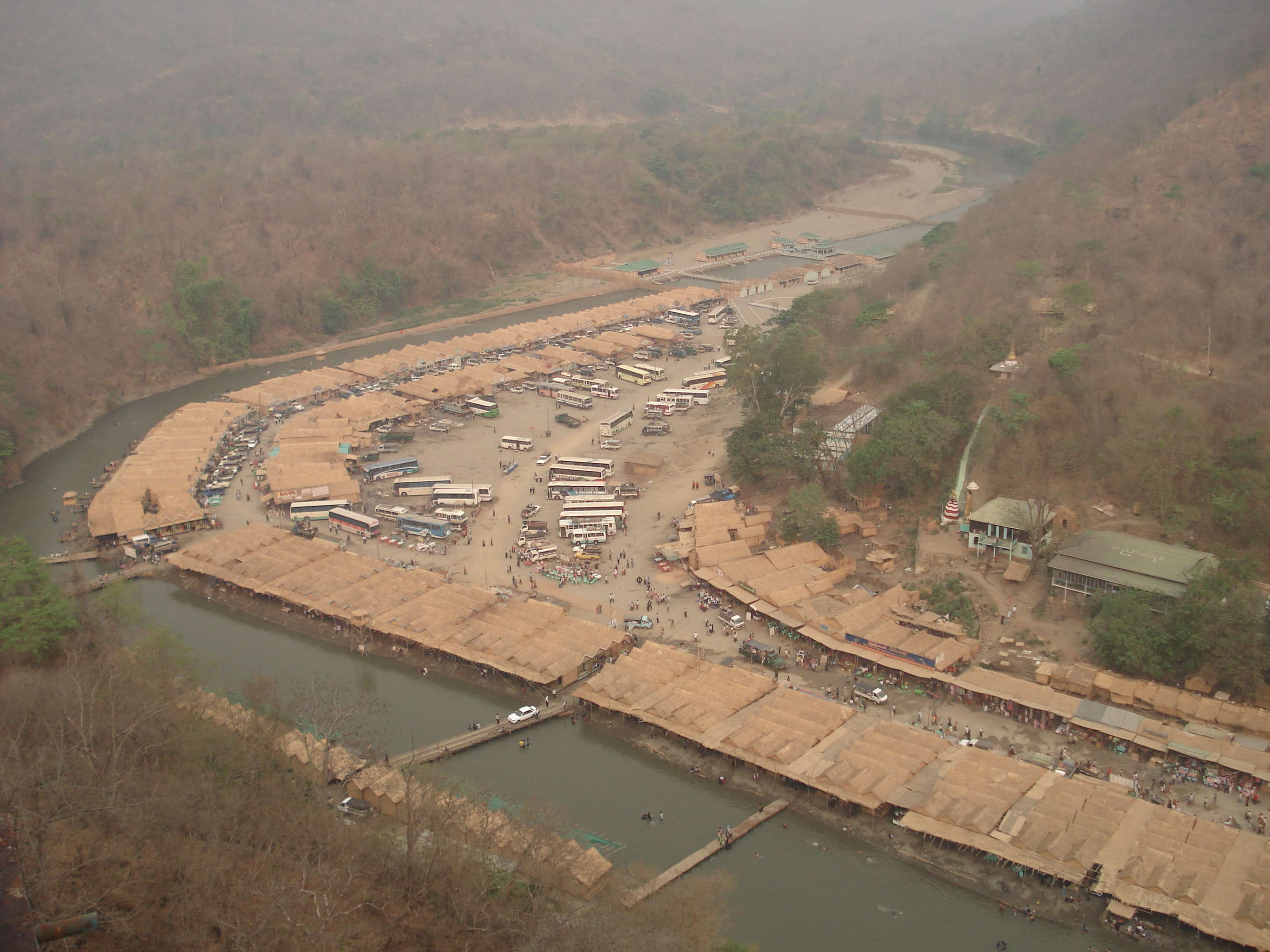
Shwe Settaw Pagoda festival

A pair of Buddha's footprints are located in Settawya, a forest retreat which is 34 miles (55 km) west of Minbu on the opposite bank of Magwe and is 331 miles (533 km) from Yangon by road. The footprints are well preserved and shrines have been constructed nearby. The place is known as the Pagoda site of the forest. The pilgrimage is combined with photography for young people, as the scenery is picturesque. One can go there also by Minbu- A Road following branches lane at 22 miles (35 km) post. The site is on the river Man. The festival is held on the fifth waxing moon of the Myanmar calendar month, Tabodwe (February and March) annually. Many people, from different parts of the country, gather there and make meritorious deeps singly or collectively.

On the way from Minbu, visitors can pay homage to Sandalwood Monastery at Legging where the Buddha had visited in his lifetime. The history of that Footprint Pagoda dated back to the time of Buddha. Once the Buddha came to that site in the country of Sunapranta. He met the Orahat Sicca Vanda and Naga Nammada on his way and on their humble request, he granted their reverence. The footprints were enshrined ever since. The lower footprint on the slat is under water during the monsoon months as the river Man is flooded. Therefore, the festival is celebrated in the later winter months. Minbu is very hot in summer.

From Minbu, there is a road that can transport you to Rakhine State and you can go to the most famous pagoda Kyaungdawya Pagoda (ကျောင်းတော်ရာ).

In Minbu, there is a lot of crab and dried fish and dried shrimp (ပုဇွန်) you can buy. This is transported from Rakhine.

One of the Asian elephants at Twycross Zoo in the United Kingdom was named after the city of Minbu, as it is originally from Myanmar.

== Climate ==
Minbu, as part of the central Myanmar “dry zone” in the rain shadow of the 3,000 metres or 10,000 feet-high Arakan Mountains, has a hot semi-arid climate (Köppen BSh). The climate is hot to sweltering year-round and has two seasons, wet and dry, of similar length. Unlike most monsoonal semi-arid climates, the rainy season is relatively long at around five to six months, while variability and extreme monthly and daily rainfalls are much lower than usual with this type of climate.

Climate data for Minbu (1991–2020)
Month	Jan	Feb	Mar	Apr	May	Jun	Jul	Aug	Sep	Oct	Nov	Dec	Year
Record high °C (°F)	34.0 (93.2)	39.8 (103.6)	43.2 (109.8)	45.6 (114.1)	45.0 (113.0)	43.0 (109.4)	40.0 (104.0)	39.4 (102.9)	38.0 (100.4)	37.1 (98.8)	38.0 (100.4)	35.4 (95.7)	45.6 (114.1)
Mean daily maximum °C (°F)	29.7 (85.5)	34.7 (94.5)	38.7 (101.7)	40.7 (105.3)	38.1 (100.6)	34.2 (93.6)	33.0 (91.4)	32.9 (91.2)	33.1 (91.6)	33.0 (91.4)	31.7 (89.1)	28.6 (83.5)	34 (93)
Daily mean °C (°F)	21.5 (70.7)	25.1 (77.2)	29.5 (85.1)	32.6 (90.7)	31.9 (89.4)	29.7 (85.5)	29.0 (84.2)	28.9 (84.0)	28.8 (83.8)	28.2 (82.8)	25.7 (78.3)	22.0 (71.6)	27.7 (81.9)
Mean daily minimum °C (°F)	13.3 (55.9)	15.5 (59.9)	20.2 (68.4)	24.5 (76.1)	25.7 (78.3)	25.2 (77.4)	24.9 (76.8)	24.8 (76.6)	24.4 (75.9)	23.3 (73.9)	19.8 (67.6)	15.3 (59.5)	21.4 (70.5)
Record low °C (°F)	8.0 (46.4)	7.7 (45.9)	13.0 (55.4)	17.4 (63.3)	17.5 (63.5)	19.4 (66.9)	20.0 (68.0)	19.8 (67.6)	19.2 (66.6)	17.5 (63.5)	12.0 (53.6)	10.0 (50.0)	7.7 (45.9)
Average precipitation mm (inches)	5.9 (0.23)	0.9 (0.04)	3.9 (0.15)	15.8 (0.62)	92.9 (3.66)	129.8 (5.11)	104.4 (4.11)	138.7 (5.46)	152.8 (6.02)	131.6 (5.18)	26.3 (1.04)	5.5 (0.22)	808.7 (31.84)
Average precipitation days (≥ 1.0 mm)	0.5	0.1	0.4	1.3	7.1	12.9	11.9	12.4	11.6	8.6	2.6	1.0	70.5
Source 1: World Meteorological Organization
Source 2: Meteomanz(record)

== Notable resident ==
- Ohn Maung
