= West Yangon District =

District in Yangon region, Myanmar

Coordinates: 16°49′05″N 96°08′28″E

West Yangon District is a district of the Yangon Region in Myanmar.

location in Yangon region

== Townships ==
- Ahlon
- Bahan
- Dagon
- Hlaing
- Kamayut
- Kyauktada
- Kyimyindaing
- Lanmadaw
- Latha
- Mayangon
- Pabedan
- Sanchaung

Seikkan Township was split and merged into Botataung Township and Lanmadaw Township in February 2020.
