= Miss and Mister Supranational Myanmar =

National beauty pageant

Supranational Myanmar
- မယ်ဗမာ
- Formation: 2023; 3 years ago
- Type: Beauty pageant
- Headquarters: Yangon
- Location: Myanmar
- Members: Miss Supranational; Mister Supranational; Mister Global; Face of Beauty International; Mr. and Ms. Chinatown Global
- Official language: Burmese
- National Director: Kaung Myat
- Parent organization: TRUST Entertainment
- Website: supranationalmyanmar.com

Miss and Mister Supranational Myanmar also known as Miss and Mister Burma Supranational is a national pageant to select Myanmar's representative to the Miss Supranational and Mister Supranational pageant. This pageant is unrelated to the Miss Universe Myanmar, Miss International Myanmar, Miss World Myanmar or Miss Golden Land Myanmar national contests.

== History ==
The Miss Golden Land Myanmar Organization selected Myanmar’s representatives for the Miss Supranational international pageant from 2013 to 2019, during which Miss Golden Land Myanmar served as the national title for Myanmar’s delegates.

In 2020, the Miss Burma Organization acquired the Miss Supranational license and was expected to continue selecting Myanmar representatives. However, after the cancellation of the Miss Supranational Pageant, Myanmar did not send a contestant in the following years, resulting in an absence from the competition until 2023.

In 2024, Hello Madam Media, the parent organization of Miss Universe Myanmar, acquired the Miss Supranational and Mister Supranational licenses. The organization appointed Dee, first runner-up of Miss Universe Myanmar 2023, as Miss Supranational Myanmar, marking Myanmar’s return to the pageant after a long hiatus. In the same year, Thet Oo Maung Maung, winner of Mister Supranational Myanmar 2023, was selected to represent Myanmar at Mister Supranational.

In 2025, Hello Madam Media transferred the Miss Supranational and Mister Supranational licenses to Trust Entertainment, led by Mr. Kaung Myat. The organization conducted two separate final coronation ceremonies, one for Miss Supranational Myanmar and one for Mister Supranational Myanmar, to select Myanmar’s representatives. The winners of the 2026 national titles were Zaw Sam Naw of Myitkyina, who was crowned Mister Supranational Myanmar 2026 (Later Dethroned), and Zin Moe Pyae of Pyay, who was crowned Miss Supranational Myanmar 2026.

== Titleholders ==
Year	Edition	Date	Miss Supranational Myanmar	Runners up					Final venue	Host city	Entrants
Year	Edition	Date	Miss Supranational Myanmar	First	Second	Third	Fourth	Fifth	Final venue	Host city	Entrants
2014	1st	August 21	Han Thi; Yangon	Eaint Myat Chal; Mon State	Thu Thet Su Nyunt; Yangon	Not awarded	Not awarded	Not awarded	Myanmar Convention Center (MCC)	Yangon	20
2015	2nd	June 21	L Bawk Nu; Kachin State	Si Si Aye Ko; Yangon	Thin Thel Bo; Yangon	Not awarded	Not awarded	Not awarded	Myanmar Convention Center (MCC)	Yangon	21
2016	3rd	September 9	Swe Zin Htet; Naypyitaw	Poe Wathon Kyaw; Kayah State	Eaint Pyae Kyaw; Chin State	Not awarded	Not awarded	Not awarded	Myanmar Convention Center (MCC)	Yangon	20
2017	4th	October 11	Shwe Hmue Han; Kachin State	Not awarded	Not awarded	Not awarded	Not awarded	Not awarded	Myanmar Convention Center (MCC)	Yangon	30
2018	5th	August 15	Shwe Eain Si; Rakhine State	Htet Eaindra Win (Elena Win); Shan State (East)	Nang Cherry (Yangon Region) Yangon (South)	Ei Thandar Aung (Yangon Region) Yangon (East)	Theint Zar Chi Nyunt; Mandalay Region	Htet Lin Htwe (Sam); Tanintharyi Region	Taw Win Garden Hotel	Yangon	25
2019-2020 Cancelled due to COVID-19 pandemic
Did not Compete between 2021-2023
No Competition Held (Representative Appointed) 2024-2025
2026	6th	December 17, 2025	Zin Moe Pyae; Bago Region	Akari Hmue Paing; Kachin State	Sasha Viola; Bago Region	Shwe Shwe San; Rakhine State	Eaint Khine Bhone; Naypyitaw	Amelia; Mandalay Region	Myanmar Expo	Yangon	20

=== Winners by City/Town ===
Division	Titles	Winning Years
Kachin State	2	2015, 2017
Bago Region	1	2026
Mandalay Region	1	2025
Mon State	1	2024
Rakhine State	1	2018
Naypyitaw	1	2016
Yangon	1	2014

== International pageants ==
Color keys

- : Declared as Winner
- : Ended as Runner-up or Top 5
- : Ended as one of the Finalists
- : Ended as one of the Semi-finalists
- : Ended as Unplaced and have special awards

=== Miss Supranational ===
Year	Hometown	Representative's Name	Title	Placement	Special Awards
2026	(Bago Region) Pyay	Zin Moe Pyae	Miss Supranational Myanmar 2026	Unplaced	
2025	(Mandalay Region) Meiktila	Cherry Moe	1st Runner-up of Miss Universe Myanmar 2024	Unplaced	1 Special Award: Top 20 - Miss Influencer Opportunity
2024	(Mon State) Thanbyuzayat	Dee	1st Runner-up of Miss Universe Myanmar 2023	Top 25	4 Special Awards: Miss Influencer Opportunity; Top 7 - Miss Talent; Top 10 - Supra Fan Vote; Top 11 - Supra Model of the Year (Top 3 - Supra Model of Asia)
Did not Compete between 2021-2023
2019	(Mon State) Chaungzon	Eaint Myat Chal	Miss Golden Land Myanmar 2015	Unplaced	
2018	Rakhine State	Shwe Eain Si	Miss Golden Land Myanmar 2018	Top 25	3 Special Awards: Top 10 - Royal Dinner Winner; Top 10 - Photoshoot with Raymond Saldana (Facebook); Top 20 - Beautiful Piece of Jewelry
2017	Kachin State	Shwe Hmue Han	Miss Supranational Myanmar 2017	Unplaced	
2016	Naypyitaw	Swe Zin Htet	Miss Supranational Myanmar 2016	Top 10	2 Special Award: *Miss Popularity; *Miss Congeniality
2015	Kachin State	L Bawk Nu	Miss Supranational Myanmar 2015	Top 20	3 Special Awards: Miss Internet; Most Beautiful Evening Gown; Top 3 - Woman of Substance
2014	(Yangon Region) South Okkalapa	Han Thi	Miss Supranational Myanmar 2014	Top 10	2 Special Awards: Queen of Asia & Oceania; Miss Internet
2013	(Yangon Region) Yangon	Khin Wint Wah	Appointed	Top 20	3 Special Awards: Best Evening Gown; Miss Internet; Top 3 - Woman of Substance

=== Face of Beauty International ===
Year	Hometown	Representative's Name	Title	Placement	Special Awards
2026	(Kachin State) Myitkyina	Akari Hmue Paing	1st runner-up of Miss Supranational Myanmar 2026	TBA	TBA

=== Miss Chinatown Global ===
Year	Hometown	Representative's Name	Title	Placement	Special Awards
2026	(Bago Region) Bago	Sasha Viola	2nd runner-up of Miss Supranational Myanmar 2026	Unplaced	-

=== 2026: Provincial representatives ===
Miss Supranational Myanmar National Finalists 6th Edition (2026)
Year Capitals & Cities, etc.	2026
(Bago Region) Bago	Sasha Viola (2nd)
(Kachin State) Bhamo	Nann Hnin Tharaphy (Top 11)
(Tanintharyi Region) Dawei	Phyo Thinzar Zaw (Top 11)
(Chin State) Hakha	Shwe Yadanar Win
(Kayin State) Hpa-An	May Angel
(Mon State) Mawlamyine	Htone Nadi Oo
(Mon State) Mudon	Khin Wutt Hmone Yi
(Tanintharyi Region) Myeik	Nint Thint Kuue
(Kachin State) Myitkyina	Akari Hmue Paing (1st)
Naypyidaw	Eaint Khin Bhone (4th)
(Bago Region) Pyay	Zin Moe Pyae (W)
(Mandalay Region) Pyin Oo Lwin	Amelia (5th)
(Rakhine State) Sittwe	Shwe Shwe San (3rd)
(Shan State) Tachileik	Katie (Top 11)
(Shan State) Taunggyi	Nan Thet Thet Nyein
(Bago Region) Taungoo	Chaw Su Su Aung
(Yangon Region) Yangon (East)	Nandar Myitzu Myint
(Yangon Region) Yangon (North)	Win Pa Pa Kyaw
(Yangon Region) Yangon (South)	Poe Pan Chi (Top 11)
(Yangon Region) Yangon (West)	Nway Nway Thu Aung (Top 11)
Total	20

== Mister Supranational Myanmar ==
=== Titleholders ===
Year	Edition	Date	Mister Supranational Myanmar	Runners up					Final venue	Host city	Entrants
Year	Edition	Date	Mister Supranational Myanmar	First	Second	Third	Fourth	Fifth	Final venue	Host city	Entrants
2024	1st	7 March	Thet Oo Maung Maung (Yangon Region) Yangon	Thura Zaw (Yangon Region) Yangon	Thura Than Htun (Yangon Region) Yangon	Zwel Zin (Yangon Region) Yangon	David Oo (Mon State) Mawlamyine	Arker Htoo Naing (Yangon Region) Yangon	Wyndham Grand Hotel	Yangon	17
2025	2nd	4 April	Hlaing Bwar (Mon State) Mawlamyine	Di Yan (Yangon Region) Yangon	Bhone Myint Zaw (Yangon Region) Yangon	Thant Zin (Sagaing Region) Sagaing	Thiha Htun (Ayeyarwady Region) Hinthada	San Min Hein Htut (Yangon Region) Yangon	Myanmar Expo	Yangon	17
2026	3rd	18 December 2025	Zaw Sam Naw* (Dethroned) (Kachin State) Myitkyina	Htet Wai Aung (Yangon Region) Yangon (South)	Htoo Aung Wai (Bago Region) Taungoo	Hein Khant (Yangon Region) Yangon (West)	Saw Lin Myat (Kayin State) Hpa-An	Wathan Htun (Bago Region) Bago	Myanmar Expo	Yangon	19
2026	3rd	18 December 2025	Thiha Htun* (assumed) (Ayeyarwady Region) Hinthada	Htet Wai Aung (Yangon Region) Yangon (South)	Htoo Aung Wai (Bago Region) Taungoo	Hein Khant (Yangon Region) Yangon (West)	Saw Lin Myat (Kayin State) Hpa-An	Wathan Htun (Bago Region) Bago	Myanmar Expo	Yangon	19

=== Winners by City/Town ===
Division	Titles	Winning Years
Kachin State	2	2018, 2026
Mon State	1	2025
Yangon Region	1	2024
Mandalay Region	1	2017

== International pageants ==
Color keys

- : Declared as Winner
- : Ended as Runner-up or Top 5
- : Ended as one of the Finalists
- : Ended as one of the Semi-finalists
- : Ended as Unplaced and have special awards

=== Mister Supranational ===
Year	Hometown	Representative's Name	Title	Placement	Special Awards
2026	(Kachin State) Myitkyina	Zaw Sam Naw	Mister Supranational Myanmar 2026	Unplaced	
2025	(Mon State) Mawlamyine	Hlaing Bwar	Mister Supranational Myanmar 2025	Unplaced	
2024	(Yangon Region) Yangon	Thet Oo Maung Maung	Mister Supranational Myanmar 2024	Unplaced	2 Special Awards: Top 3 - Mister Influencer Opportunity; Top 10 - Supra Fan-vote
Did not Compete between 2019-2023
2018	(Kachin State) Mohnyin	Ellis Lwin	Appointed	Top 20	1 Special Award: Mister Popularity
2017	(Mandalay Region) Meiktila	Htoo Ant Lwin	Appointed	Top 20	

=== Mister Global ===
Year	Hometown	Representative's Name	Title	Placement	Special Awards
2026	(Yangon Region) Yangon (South)	Htet Wai Aung	1st runner-up of Mister Supranational Myanmar 2026	TBA	TBA
2025	(Yangon Region) Yangon	Di Yan	1st runner-up of Mister Supranational Myanmar 2025	Top 20	

=== Mister Chinatown Global ===
Year	Hometown	Representative's Name	Title	Placement	Special Awards
2026	(Bago Region) Taungoo	Htoo Aung Wai	2nd runner-up of Mister Supranational Myanmar 2026	unplaced	-

== National finalists ==
The following list is the national finalists of the Mister Supranational Myanmar pageant, as well as the competition results.

Color keys
W Declared as the winner
Ended as a runner-up
Ended as a semi-finalist
Ended as a Quarterfinalist
– Did not participate
Withdraw during the competition

=== 2024-2025: No provincial title ===
Mister Supranational Myanmar National Finalists 1st & 2nd Editions (2024-2025)
Year No.	2024	2025
01	(Yangon Region) Yangon - Arker Htoo Naing (5th)	(Mon State) Mawlamyine - Hlaing Bwar (W)
02	(Yangon Region) Kungyangon - Aung Kyaw Phyoe	(Yangon Region) Yangon - Bhone Myint Zaw (2nd)
03	(Mon State) Mawlamyine - David Oo (4th)	(Mandalay Region) Mandalay - Zin Ko Htet
04	(Yangon Region) Yangon - Htun Htun Naing	(Yangon Region) Yangon - Di Yan (1st)
05	(Yangon Region) Yangon - Kyaw Ko Ko Win	(Tanintharyi Region) Dawei - Nyi Hein (Top 10)
06	(Yangon Region) Yangon - La Pyae (Top 10)	(Yangon Region) Yangon - Zarni Min Tun (Top 10)
07	(Mon State) Thaton - Nyi Sak Paing	(Yangon Region) Yangon - San Min Hein Htut (5th)
08	(Yangon Region) Yangon - Shane (Top 10)	(Mandalay Region) Pyin Oo Lwin - Shin Thant Naing
09	(Yangon Region) Yangon - Thant Zaw Tun	(Rakhine State) Sittwe - Paing Soe Thu
10	(Yangon Region) Yangon - Thant Zin Oo	(Yangon Region) Yangon - Ko Pyae
11	(Yangon Region) Yangon - Thet Oo Maung Maung (W)	(Rakhine State) Kyaukphyu - Hein Htet Zaw (Top 10)
12	(Yangon Region) Yangon - Thura Than Htun (2nd)	(Yangon Region) Yangon - Thaw Zin Khant
13	(Yangon Region) Yangon - Thura Zaw (1st)	(Mandalay Region) Mandalay - Aung Thiha
14	(Yangon Region) Yangon - YJ Daung Loon (Top 10)	(Mandalay Region) Mandalay - Min Khant Win
15	(Yangon Region) Yangon - Zang Min Paing (Top 10)	(Ayeyarwady Region) Hinthada - Thiha Htun (4th)
16	(Kachin State) Myitkyina - Zaw Seng Aung	(Yangon Region) Yangon - Lamung David (Top 10)
17	(Yangon Region) Yangon - Zwel Zin (3rd)	(Sagaing Region) Sagaing - Thant Zin (3rd)
Total	17	17

=== 2026: Provincial representatives ===
Mister Supranational Myanmar National Finalists 3rd Editions (2026)
Year Capitals & Cities, etc.	2026
(Bago Region) Bago	Wathan Htun (5th)
(Tanintharyi Region) Dawei	Nay Pyae
(Chin State) Hakha	Nyunt Thu Ya Zaw
(Kayin State) Hpa-An	Saw Lin Myat (4th)
(Mon State) Mawlamyine	Myat Hpone Kyaw
(Mon State) Mudon	Kaung Chin Ti Kyi
(Tanintharyi Region) Myeik	Thu Ya San
(Kachin State) Myitkyina	Zaw Sam Naw (W)
Naypyidaw	William Shane (Top 10)
(Bago Region) Pyay	Moe Thar Oo (Top 10)
(Mandalay Region) Pyin Oo Lwin	Sai Thura Nyan
(Rakhine State) Sittwe	Nyein Thawy Maung (Top 10)
(Shan State) Tachileik	Khant Zaw Htet (Top 10)
(Shan State) Taunggyi	Linn Myat
(Bago Region) Taungoo	Htoo Aung Wai (2nd)
(Yangon Region) Yangon (East)	Nay Htet
(Yangon Region) Yangon (North)	Chan Myae Zaw
(Yangon Region) Yangon (South)	Htet Wai Aung (1st)
(Yangon Region) Yangon (West)	Hein Khant (3rd)
Total	19

== Mister Supranational Myanmar 2024 ==
=== Contestants ===
17 contestants competed for the title.

No.	Candidates	Age (Note: Ages at the time of the pageant)	Height	Weight	Hometown	Placement	Special Awards	Note
01	Arker Htoo Naing	32	173 cm (5 ft 8 in)		Yangon	5th Runner Up	Supra Fan Vote	
02	Aung Kyaw Phyoe	27	180 cm (5 ft 11 in)		Kungyangon			
03	David Oo	26	178 cm (5 ft 10 in)		Mawlamyine	4th Runner Up	Star Trust Awards, Mr. Photogenic	
04	Htun Htun Naing	31	170 cm (5 ft 7 in)		Yangon			
05	Kyaw Ko Ko Win	28	178 cm (5 ft 10 in)		Yangon			
06	La Pyae	20	180 cm (5 ft 11 in)		Yangon	Top 10		
07	Nyi Sak Paing	24	165 cm (5 ft 5 in)		Thaton			
08	Shane	24	170 cm (5 ft 7 in)		Yangon	Top 10		
09	Thant Zaw Tun	27	173 cm (5 ft 8 in)		Yangon			
10	Thant Zin Oo	18	187 cm (6 ft 1 1/2 in)		Yangon			
11	Thet Oo Maung Maung	25	185 cm (6 ft 1 in)		Yangon	Winner	Mr. Charming, Mr. Elegant, Best in Evening Suit, Best Body Awards	
12	Thura Than Htun	19	173 cm (5 ft 8 in)		Yangon	2nd Runner Up	New Face of Sisburma	
13	Thura Zaw	23	178 cm (5 ft 10 in)		Yangon	1st Runner Up	Flash Sports Guy, Face of Khai Khai, Best Body Awards, Contestant's choice	
14	YJ Daung Loon	27	178 cm (5 ft 10 in)	65 kg	Yangon	Top 10		
15	Zang Min Paing	21	183 cm (6 ft 0 in)	64 kg	Yangon	Top 10		
16	Zaw Seng Aung	21	183 cm (6 ft 0 in)	70 kg	Myitkyina			
17	Zwal Zin	22	180 cm (5 ft 11 in)	71 kg	Yangon	3rd Runner Up	Top Model	

=== Withdrawals ===
- Yae Ko Ko withdrew for personal reasons.

== See also ==
- List of beauty pageants
