= Miss Earth Myanmar =

Annual beauty contest in Myanmar

- မယ်ကမ္ဘာမြေ မြန်မာ
- Formation: 2014; 12 years ago
- Type: Beauty pageant
- Headquarters: Yangon
- Location: Myanmar
- Members: Miss Earth
- Official language: Burmese, English
- National Director: Henrich San Thar
- Website: Website

Miss Earth Myanmar is a national beauty pageant in Myanmar organized by Miss Earth Myanmar Organization.

== History ==
Miss Earth Myanmar is a beauty pageant in Myanmar where the winner represents her country at the Miss Earth pageant. The winners become an Environmental Ambassador in Myanmar and participate in environmental conservation activities.

The main purpose of the title is: "Beauties for a Cause".

== Titleholders ==
Year	Edition	Date	Miss Earth Myanmar	Runners up				Final venue	Host city	Entrants
Year	Edition	Date	Miss Earth Myanmar	First	Second	Third	Fourth	Final venue	Host city	Entrants
2014	1st	August 21	Ei Mon Khine (Yangon Region) Yangon	Eaint Myat Chal; Mon State	Thu Thet Su Nyunt (Yangon Region) Yangon	Not awarded	Not awarded	Myanmar Convention Center (MCC)	Yangon	25
2015	2nd	June 21	Eaint Myat Chal (Mon State) Chaungzon	Ci Ci Aye Ko (Yangon Region) Yangon	Thin Thel Bo (Yangon Region) Yangon	Not awarded	Not awarded	Myanmar Convention Center (MCC)	Yangon	30
2016	3rd	August 27	Nan Khine Shwe Warwin; Kayin State	Poe Wathon Kyaw; Kayah State	Eaint Pyae Kyaw; Chin State	Not awarded	Not awarded	Myanmar Convention Center (MCC)	Yangon	20
2017	4th	June 24	Tin Sandar Myo (Yangon Region) Yangon	Air	Water	Fire	Eco-Tourism	National Theater of Yangon	Yangon	26
2017	4th	June 24	Tin Sandar Myo (Yangon Region) Yangon	Susan Shwine (Yangon Region) Yangon	Yin Yin Htet (Yangon Region) Yangon	Su Wut Yee (Yangon Region) Yangon	Hnin Wai Wai Nwal (Yangon Region) Yangon	National Theater of Yangon	Yangon	26
2018	5th	November 18	Chaw Yupar Thet (Yangon Region) Yangon	Teen Earth	Air	Water	Fire	LOTTE Hotel & Serviced Apartments	Yangon	12
2018	5th	November 18	Chaw Yupar Thet (Yangon Region) Yangon	Yon Nu Waddy (Yangon Region) Yangon	May Myat Noe Thwe (Yangon Region) Yangon	Shu Ma Nyee Paing (Yangon Region) Yangon	Pyae Phu Mon (Yangon Region) Yangon	LOTTE Hotel & Serviced Apartments	Yangon	12
2019	6th	August 28	May Thadar Ko (Mandalay Region) Mandalay	Shwe Chuu Ngone (Mandalay Region) Innwa	Linn Thadar (Yangon Region) Yangon (West)	Aye Myat Noe Aung (Mandalay Region) Pyin Oo Lwin	Zun Zin Zin Tun (Magway Region) Minbu	Diamond Plaza Mandalay	Mandalay	22
2020-21	7th	2020 August 31	Amara Shune Lei (Yangon Region) Yangon (East)	Runner-up	Second	Third	Fourth	Diamond Plaza Mandalay	Mandalay	19
2020-21	7th	2020 August 31	Amara Shune Lei (Yangon Region) Yangon (East)	Theint Zar Chi (Shan State) Taunggyi	Not awarded	Not awarded	Not awarded	Diamond Plaza Mandalay	Mandalay	19
2022	8th	September 17	Thawn Han Thar (Dethroned) (Yangon Region) Yangon	Air	Land	Water	Fire	Tachileik	Shan State	10
2022	8th	September 17	Thawn Han Thar (Dethroned) (Yangon Region) Yangon	Nwe Ni Winn (Assumed) (Yangon Region) Yangon	Kyi Phyu Khin (Yangon Region) Yangon	Amelia (Rakhine State) Kyaukphyu	Kyawt Tha Khin (Yangon Region) Yangon	Tachileik	Shan State	10
2023	9th	October 14	Soung Hnin San (Shan State) Muse	Su Pyae Mon (Yangon Region) Yangon (East)	Khisa Khin (Mon State) Mawlamyine	Zon La Young Hnin; Naypyidaw	Chaw Akaree Kyaw (Yangon Region) Yangon (South)	The Royal Mei Hua Function Hall	Yangon	20
No competition held (Representative appointed)
2025	10th	August 6	Khin Khin Hlaing (Rakhine State) Sittwe	Air	Water	Fire	—	Sedona Hotel	Yangon	16
2025	10th	August 6	Khin Khin Hlaing (Rakhine State) Sittwe	Moe Thandar Tin (Bago Region) Bago	L Bawk Ja (Kachin State) Myitkyina	Nu Nu Seng (Kachin State) Hpakant	—	Sedona Hotel	Yangon	16

=== Winners by City/Town ===
City	Titles	Winning years
(Yangon Region) Yangon	3	2014, 2017, 2018, 2022*
(Rakhine State) Sittwe	1	2025
(Bago Region) Taungoo	1	2024
(Shan State) Muse	1	2023
(Yangon Region) Yangon (East)	1	2020/21
(Mandalay Region) Mandalay	1	2019
Kayin State	1	2016
(Mon State) Chaungzon	1	2015

== International pageants ==
Color keys

- : Declared as Winner
- : Ended as runner-up or top 4 qualification
- : Ender as one of the Finalists
- : Ended as one of the Semi-finalists
- : Ended as special awards winner

=== Miss Earth ===
- Amara Shune Lei has the highest placement as she placed Top 8 at Miss Earth 2020

Year	Representative's Name	Hometown	Title	Placement	Special Awards
2025	Khin Khin Hlaing	(Rakhine State) Sittwe	Miss Earth Myanmar 2025	Unplaced	
2024	Thaw Dar Sun	(Bago Region) Taungoo	4th Runner Up of Miss Universe Myanmar 2024	Unplaced	
2023	Soung Hnin San	(Shan State) Muse	Miss Earth Myanmar 2023	Unplaced	4 Special Awards: (bronze) Best Appearance; Best Bikini (Top 3); Best National Costume (Asia & Oceania) (Top 3); People's Choice Award (Asia & Oceania) (Top 7)
2022	Thawn Han Thar	(Yangon Region) Yangon	Miss Earth Myanmar 2022		
2021	Linn Htet Htet Kyaw	(Kachin State) Myitkyina	Miss Earth Myanmar 2021	Unplaced	
2020	Amara Shune Lei	Yangon (East)	Miss Earth Myanmar 2020	Top 8	5 Special Awards: (gold) Beach Wear; (silver) Evening Gown; (silver) Sports Wear; (silver) Talent Competition (Creative); (bronze) Best National Costume
2019	May Thadar Ko	Mandalay	Miss Earth Myanmar 2019	Unplaced	
2018	Chaw Yupar Thet	Yangon	Miss Earth Myanmar 2018	Unplaced	
2017	Tin Sandar Myo	Yangon	Miss Earth Myanmar 2017	Unplaced	
2016	Nan Khine Shwe Warwin	Kayin State	Miss Golden Land Myanmar 2016	Unplaced	2 Special Awards: (silver) Miss Photogenic; (bronze) Miss Friendship
2015	Eaint Myat Chal	(Mon State) Chaungzon	Miss Golden Land Myanmar 2015	Unplaced	
2014	Ei Mon Khine	Yangon	Miss Golden Land Myanmar 2014	Unplaced	1 Special Awards: (bronze) Miss Photogenic

=== Miss Tourism International ===
Year	Representative's Name	Hometown	Title	Placement	Special Awards
2023	Khisa Khin	(Mon State) Mawlamyine	Miss Earth Myanmar - Land 2023	Unplaced	

== National finalists ==
The following list is the national finalists of the Miss Earth Myanmar pageant, as well as the competition results.

Color keys
W Declared as the winner
Ended as a runner-up
Ended as a semi-finalist
Ended as a Quarterfinalist
– Did not participate

=== 2017–2022: No provincial title ===
Miss Earth Myanmar National Finalists 1st–2nd & 5th Editions (2019–2022)
Year No.	2017	2018	2022
01	Hla Myat Chel (Top 16)		Thawn Han Thar (W) (Dethroned)
02	Lai Shwe Yee Min Aung		Kyi Phyu Khin (2nd – Miss Earth Water)
03	Chan Myae Thida (Top 8)		Shu La May
04	Yuki San (5th – Miss Teen Earth)		Amelia (1st – Miss Earth Air)
05	Eve Thandar Lwin		Win Le Mon Myat
06	Yin Yin Htet (3rd – Miss Earth Fire)		Phyo Yadanar Kyaw (Top 8)
07	Su Wut Yee (2nd – Miss Earth Water)		Kay Thiri Phyu (Top 8)
08	Khin Eaindray Htun (Top 16)		Nwe Ni Winn (W) (Successor)
09	Hsu Thinzar Htet		Kyawt Tha Khin (3rd – Miss Earth Fire)
10	Nay Chi Oo (Top 16)	—	Kyaw Kyaw Soe Hlaing (Top 8)
11	Hnin Wai Wai Nwe (4th – Miss Eco-Tourism)	—	—
12	May Oo Mon (Top 16)	—	—
13	Nang May Yadanar Htun (Top 16)	—	—
14	Susan Shwine (1st – Miss Earth Air)	—	—
15	Thaw Thaw La Min	—	—
16	Su Myat Moe (Top 8)	—	—
17	Phoo Phoo Pyae Sone	—	—
18	Soe Eaindra Nwe	—	—
19	Phyo Theint Nandar	—	—
20	Poe Ei Phyu	—	—
21	Ei Ei Htun (Top 16)	—	—
22	Cho Ko Ko (Top 16)	—	—
23	Cheint Walar (Top 16)	—	—
24	Aye Yu Khaing Win	—	—
25	Tin Sandar Myo (W)	—	—
26	Thandar Soe	—	—
Total	26	12	10

=== 2019–2023: Provincial representatives ===
Miss Earth Myanmar National Finalists 3rd-4th, 6th, & 10th Editions (2019–2021), (2023-2025)
Year Capitals & Cities, etc.	2019	2020/2021	2023	2025
(Ayeyarwady Region) Ayeyarwady	La Yaung Tunn (Top 15)	—	—	—
(Mandalay Region) Bagan	Sam (Top 9)	—	–	—
(Bago Region) Bago	Thara Wun	Eain Met Cho	Nang Su Zin (Top 15)	Moe Thandar Tin (1st – Miss Earth Air)
(Kachin State) Bhamo	—	Lulu Seng	—	Elizabeth
(Tanintharyi Region) Dawei	—	Hka Mai	Naw Be Kan Ku (Top 15)	—
(Ayeyarwady Region) Hainggyikyun	—	Thet Htar Swe (Top 13)	—	—
(Chin State) Hakha	Do Theih Sang	—	—	—
(Kayin State) Hpa-An	—	Barani Ko (Top 13)	—	Thuta Kyal Sin
(Kachin State) Hpakant	Angel (Top 15)	Lamung Ja Seng Mai	Thet Htar Wai (Top 8) (7th place)	Nu Nu Seng (3rd - Miss Earth Fire)
(Mandalay Region) Innwa	Shwe Chuu Ngone (1st – Miss Teen Earth)	—	—	—
(Yangon Region) Insein	—	—	—	July Tint (Top 6)
(Shan State) Kalaw	—	—	—	Eaint Chuu Thwe
(Shan State) Lashio	—	Pan Pwint Phyu (Top 13)	—	—
(Magway Region) Magway	Shwe Sin Ei Phyu (Top 9)	—	—	—
(Mandalay Region) Mandalay	May Thadar Ko (W)	Nwe Ni Winn (Top 13)	Shwe Zin Kyaw (Top 15)	Hnin Pyae
(Mon State) Mawlamyine	—	Phyu Zin Thein (Top 13)	Khisa Khin (2nd – Miss Earth Land)	Thazin Myint Oo
(Mandalay Region) Meiktila	—	—	Hsu Lin Thawtar	—
(Magway Region) Minbu	Zun Zin Zin Tun (4th – Miss Earth Fire)	—	—	—
(Kachin State) Mogaung	—	Seng Lulu Pan	—	—
(Mandalay Region) Mogok	Shwe Ma Ma	—	—	—
(Sagaing Region) Monywa	—	Myat Noe Akhayar (Top 13)	Pa Pa Moe	Su Lae Lae Naing
(Mon State) Mudon	—	—	—	Rose C
(Shan State) Muse	—	Nang Mwe Phoung (Top 13)	Soung Hnin San (W)	—
(Tanintharyi Region) Myeik	—	—	Eaindray Myint Moe (Top 15)	—
(Mandalay Region) Myingyan	Htet Hnin Su	—	—	—
(Kachin State) Myitkyina	Nay Chi Linn Latt	Ah Hki Zai Pan (Top 13)	Thitsar Ye Ye Ni (Top 15)	L Bawk Ja (2nd - Miss Earth Water)
Naypyidaw	—	—	Zon La Young Hnin (3rd – Miss Earth Water)	—
(Magway Region) Pakokku	Nay Chi Nway Nway Zaw (Top 15)	—	—	—
(Ayeyarwady Region) Pathein	—	—	Khin Thinzar Tun (Top 8) (8th place)	—
(Bago Region) Pyay	Htet Htet Myat	—	—	Sung Sung
Pyinmana	—	—	Wint Thinzar Maw	—
(Mandalay Region) Pyin Oo Lwin	Aye Myat Noe Aung (3rd – Miss Earth Water)	—	Sora (Top 15)	—
(Sagaing Region) Sagaing	Mu Lay (Top 9)	—	Ei Mon Kyaw Phyo	Thae Pwint Phyu
(Sagaing Region) Shwebo	Shwe Zin Nyein	—	—	—
(Rakhine State) Sittwe	—	Pwint Kyi Pyar	Hsu Nandar Tun (Top 8) (6th place)	Khin Khin Hlaing (W)
(Shan State) Taunggyi	Wine Tone Chit (Top 15)	Theint Zar Chi (1st)	—	—
(Bago Region) Taungoo	Hay Man Thu (Top 15)	—	Zu Zu Naing (Top 15)	Khine Khine Lin
(Yangon Region) Thingangyun	—	—	—	Khin Myat Noe Kyaw (Top 6)
(Mandalay Region) Yamethin	—	—	Phoo Pwint Aung	—
(Yangon Region) Yangon (East)	Alice Sharr (5th – Miss Eco-Tourism)	Amara Shune Lei (W)	Su Pyae Mon (1st – Miss Earth Air)	—
(Yangon Region) Yangon (North)	Mi Thala Chan (Top 15)	Myin Zu (Top 13)	—	—
(Yangon Region) Yangon (South)	—	Nang Cherry (Top 13)	Chaw Akaree Kyaw (4th – Miss Earth Fire)	—
(Yangon Region) Yangon (West)	Linn Thadar (2nd – Miss Earth Air)	Nang Sam Phaung (Top 13)	—	—
Total	22	19	20	16

== See also ==
- List of beauty pageants
