= Alexia Núñez =

Brazilian and Filipino actress, beauty pageant titleholder, and fashion designer

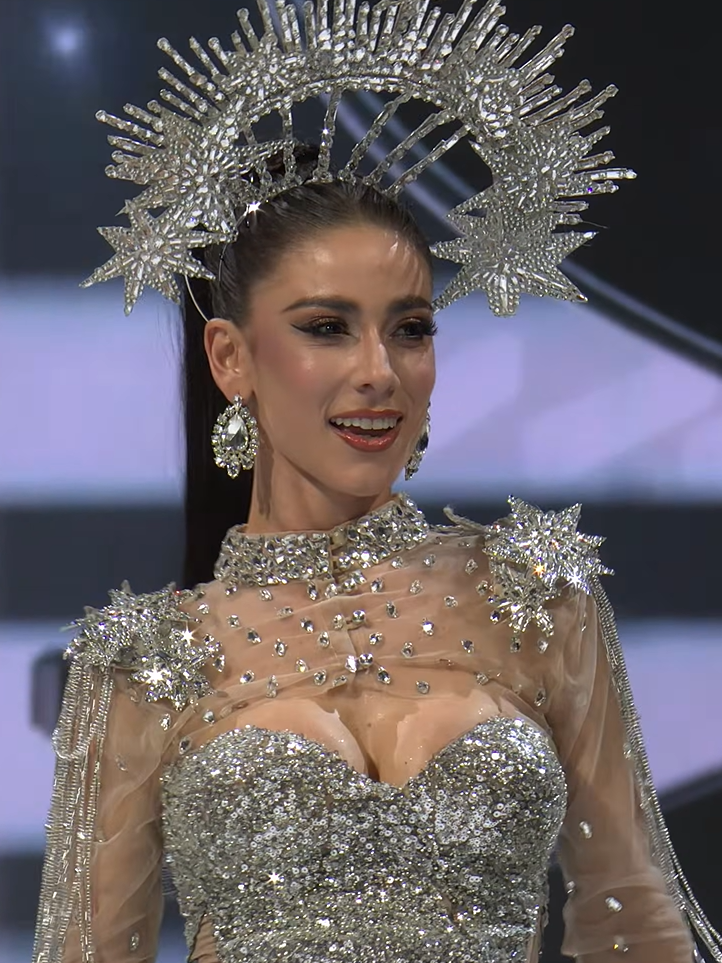
- Núñez in 2026
- Born: Alexia Núñez Müller; Brazil
- Beauty pageant titleholder
- Title: Noble Queen of the Universe 2025
- Major competitions: Noble Queen of the Universe 2025; (Winner); MGI All Stars 1st Edition; (Unplaced)

Alexia Núñez Müller-Roger is a Brazilian and Filipino actress, beauty pageant titleholder, and fashion designer who was crowned Noble Queen of the Universe 2025. She is representing the Philippines at the inaugural edition of MGI All Stars.

== Personal life ==
Núñez was born in Brazil. She is married to a Filipino businessman and public servant.

Núñez owns her own eponymous fashion brand, aimed in collaborating with indigenous artisans. She launched her fashion brand on 2025 with her debut collection made entirely out of recycled materials.

== Pageantry ==
=== Noble Queen of the Universe 2025 ===
Núñez was crowned Noble Queen of the Universe 2025 where she represented her birthplace, Brazil.

=== MGI All Stars 1st Edition ===
Núñez was confirmed as an official delegate of the inaugural MGI All Stars competition on 19 December 2025. She will represent the Philippines, becoming the second confirmed contestant from the country after Miss International Queen 2022, Fuschia Anne Ravena. Her bid in the competition is backed by Filipino socialite and businessman, Josh Yugen. She was officially crowned and sashed as the Philippine representative by Yugen on 19 April 2026.

During the preliminary competition, Núñez was recognized for leading the World's Choice Award. She was recognized by Miss Grand International 2024, CJ Opiaza.

At the end of the event, Núñez left the competition unplaced after failing to enter the top 18 semifinalists.

== Filmography ==
=== Television ===
Year	Title	Role	Notes	Source
2024	Batang Quiapo			
2025	Loverboi	Isabela		

=== Film ===
Year	Title	Role	Notes	Source
2025	Kontrabida Academy	Mauricia's Body Guard		
