= Miss Universe Myanmar 2023 =

2023 beauty pageant in Myanmar

- Date: 14 September 2023
- Presenters: Kyaw Htet Aung
- Entertainment: Aung Htet; No No K
- Venue: Novotal Hotel Max Yangon, Yangon, Myanmar
- Broadcaster: Channel 9; Skynet Teen Channel
- Entrants: 32
- Placements: 16
- Winner: Amara Bo (Shan State) Keng Tung
- Best National Costume: Yoon May Aung; (Chin State) Hakha; No No May; (Ayeyarwady Region) Pathein
- Photogenic: Khaymar Budathoki (Kachin State) Bhamo

Miss Universe Myanmar 2023 was the tenth Miss Universe Myanmar pageant, held at the Novotel Max Hotel in Yangon, Myanmar, on 14 September 2023.

Zar Li Moe of Bhamo crowned Amara Bo of Keng Tung her successor at the end of event. Amara represented Myanmar at Miss Universe 2023 in San Salvador, El Salvador.

== Background ==
=== Selection of participants ===
The 2023 edition saw the debut of Kutkai and Pyinmana, and the returns of Amarapura, Aungban, Bago, Bhamo, Falam, Hakha, Hpa-an, Hpakant, Keng Tung, Kyaukse, Lashio, Mandalay, Mawlamyine, Meiktila, Mogok, Monywa, Muse, Myitkyina, Naypyidaw, Pathein, Pyay, Pyin Oo Lwin, Sittwe, Tachileik, Taungoo, East Yangon, South Yangon and North Yangon.

Bago, Keng Tung, Kyaukse, Meiktila, Pyin Oo Lwin and Sittwe previously competed in 2018.

Lashio, Muse, Tachileik and West Yangon last competed in 2019.

Amarapura, Aungban, Bhamo, Falam, Hakha, Hpakant, Kawkareik, Mandalay, Mawlamyine, Mogok, Monywa, Myitkyina, Naypyidaw, Pathein, Pyay, Taungoo, Taunggyi, Thaton, East Yangon, South Yangon and North Yangon last competed in 2020.

=== Withdrawals ===
Out of the original 36 contestants, Miss Universe Kyaukme, Lway Hseng Nom, withdrew from the competition for personal reasons.

=== City preliminary contests ===
The following is a list of the City or District that held the local preliminary contests for the Miss Universe Myanmar 2023 pageant.

List of Miss Universe Myanmar 2023 city pageants, by the coronation date
Host city/district	Pageant	Date & Venue	Entrants	Title(s)	Ref.
(Mandalay Region) Yamethin	Miss Universe Yamethin	27 April 2023 at Thilawa Hall, Yan Myo Naing St, Yamethin	16	1 title: Miss Universe Yamethin	
(Kachin State) Myitkyina	Miss Universe Myitkyina	3 June 2023 at Manau Hall, December Hotel, Myitkyina	21	1 title: Miss Universe Myitkyina	
(Rakhine State) Sittwe	Miss Universe Sittwe (Casting)	7 June 2023 at New World Bar and Restaurant, Sittwe	11	1 title: Miss Universe Sittwe	
(Mon State) Mawlamyine	Miss Universe Mawlamyine & Thahtone	10 June at Golden River Hotel, Mawlamyine	18	2 titles: Miss Universe Mawlamyine; Miss Universe Thahtone	
(Bago Region) Taungoo	Miss Universe Taungoo	10 June 2023 at Bayinnaung Hall, KMA Kaytumadi Hotel, Taungoo	21	2 titles: Miss Universe Taungoo; Miss Universe Pyay	
(Shan State) Tachileik	Miss Universe Shan State East	16 June 2023 at Tachileik	13	2 titles: Miss Universe Keng Tung; Miss Universe Tachileik	
Naypyitaw	Miss Universe Naypyitaw & Pyinmana	18 June 2023 at New Ayeyar Hotel, Nay Pyi Taw	13	4 titles: Miss Universe Falam; Miss Universe Hakha; Miss Universe Naypyitaw; Miss Universe Pyinmana	
(Yangon Region) Yangon	Miss Universe Yangon	20 June 2023 at Wyndham Grand Hotel, Yangon	22	6 titles: Miss Universe Aungban; Miss Universe Taunggyi; Miss Universe Yangon (East); Miss Universe Yangon (West); Miss Universe Yangon (South); Miss Universe Yangon (North)	
(Kachin State) Bhamo	Miss Universe Bhamo	25 June 2023 at Friendship Hotel, Bhamo	16	1 title: Miss Universe Bhamo	
(Mandalay Region) Pyin Oo Lwin	Miss Universe Pyin Oo Lwin	25 June 2023 at GOVERNOR’S HOUSE, Pyin Oo Lwin	7	1 title: Miss Universe Pyin Oo Lwin	
(Bago Region) Bago	Miss Universe Bago & Pathein	30 June 2023 at Thuwana Shwe Bon Hall, Bago	16	4 titles: Miss Universe Bago; Miss Universe Hpa-An; Miss Universe Kawkareik; Miss Universe Pathein	
(Shan State) Muse	Miss Universe Muse	30 June 2023 at Golden Dragon Hall, Muse	19	3 title: Miss Universe Kutkai; Miss Universe Kyaukme; Miss Universe Muse	
(Kachin State) Hpakant	Miss Universe Hpakant	4 July 2023 at Nan Taw Entertainment, Myitkyina	14	1 title: Miss Universe Hpakant	
(Mandalay Region) Mandalay	Miss Universe Mandalay	5 July 2023 at Mandalay Convention Centre (MCC), Mandalay	14	3 titles: Miss Universe Lashio; Miss Universe Mandalay; Miss Universe Mogok	
(Mandalay Region) Amarapura	Miss Universe Amarapura & Kyaukse	7 July 2023 at Hotel Shwe Pyi Thar, Chan Aye Thar Zan Township, Mandalay	16	4 titles: Miss Universe Amarapura; Miss Universe Kyaukse; Miss Universe Meiktila; Miss Universe Monywa	

== Results ==
=== Placements ===
Placement	Contestant
Miss Universe Myanmar 2023	Keng Tung – Amara Bo
1st Runner-Up	Mawlamyine – Adira Oo (Dee)
2nd Runner-Up	Bhamo – Khaymar Budathoki
3rd Runner-Up	Tachileik – Nang Nandar Linn
4th Runner-Up	Pathein – No No May
5th Runner-Up	Pyin Oo Lwin – Thin Sandar Pyae Thiha Aung §
Top 11	Hpakant – Pyae Kaung Su Thant; Myitkyina – Rose Seng Htoi; Naypyitaw – Sasha Viola; Sittwe – Saw Myat Ei Khine ‡; Taunggyi – Hsu Myat Thu
Top 16	Hpa-An – Amelia; Kawkareik – Lily; Mandalay – Wutt Hmone Han; Mogok – Saung Hay Man; Muse – Seng Pan Htoi

§ – Bigo Live Myanmar Voting
‡ – National Director Choice

== Awards ==
=== Special awards ===
Award	Contestant
Best in Swimsuit	(Mon State) Mawlamyine - Dee‡; (Ayeyarwady Region) Pathein - No No May
Best National Costume	(Shan State) Tachileik - Nang Nandar Linn ‡; (Chin State) Hakha - Yoon May Aung; (Ayeyarwady Region) Pathein - No No May
Miss Healthy Body	(Mon State) Mawlamyine - Dee
Miss Real Beauty	(Kachin State) Bhamo - Khaymar Budathoki
Miss Beautiful Smile	(Kachin State) Hpakant - Pyae Kaung Su Thant
Miss Elegant	(Mon State) Mawlamyine - Dee
Miss Photogenic	(Kachin State) Bhamo - Khaymar Budathoki
Miss Popular Choice	(Rakhine State) Sittwe - Saw Myat Ei Khine
The Best Beauty Award	(Kachin State) Bhamo - Khaymar Budathoki
Miss Glamorous	(Shan State) Keng Tung - Amara Bo
Miss Intelligent	Pyin Oo Lwin - Thin Sandar Pyae Thiha Aung

=== Challenge winners ===
Title		Candidate
The Iconic Miss Universe Myanmar	Winner	(Mon State) Mawlamyine - Dee
The Iconic Miss Universe Myanmar	1st runner-up	(Rakhine State) Sittwe - Saw Myat Ei Khine
The Iconic Miss Universe Myanmar	2nd runner-up	(Kachin State) Bhamo - Khaymar Budathoki
The Iconic Miss Universe Myanmar	3rd runner-up	(Shan State) Kengtung - Amara Bo
The Iconic Miss Universe Myanmar	4th runner-up	(Kachin State) Myitkyina - Rose Seng Htoi
"This is Me, Who I Am"	Winner	(Rakhine State) Sittwe - Saw Myat Ei Khine
"This is Me, Who I Am"	Top 10	(Mandalay Region) Amarapura - Pearl Pwint Phyu; (Kachin State) Bhamo - Khaymar Budathoki; (Kayin State) Hpa-An - Amelia; (Kachin State) Hpakant - Pyae Kaung Su Thant; (Shan State) Lashio - Rosa; (Mon State) Mawlamyine - Dee; (Ayeyarwady Region) Pathein - No No May; Pyinmana - Kyi Phyu Khin; (Shan State) Taunggyi - Hsu Myat Thu
Red Carpet Star		(Ayeyarwady Region) Pathein - No No May
"I DESERVE"		(Mon State) Mawlamyine - Dee
"Keywords Battle"		(Kachin State) Bhamo - Khaymar Budathoki

== Contestants ==
32 contestants have been confirmed to participate, all representatives represent on the city level.

City/District	Candidates	Age (Note: Ages at the time of the pageant)	Height	Hometown	Placement
(Mandalay Region) Amarapura	Pearl Pwint Phyu	20	1.68 m (5 ft 6 in)	Mandalay	
(Shan State) Aungban	Zin Ei Nwe	18	1.68 m (5 ft 6 in)	Yangon	
(Bago Region) Bago	Wint Shwe Sin	23	1.70 m (5 ft 7 in)	Bago	
(Kachin State) Bhamo	Khaymar Budathoki	18	1.72 m (5 ft 7 1/2 in)	Bhamo	2nd runner-up
(Chin State) Falam	Khun Sett Cho	27	1.65 m (5 ft 5 in)	Yangon	
(Chin State) Hakha	Yoon May Aung	22	1.71 m (5 ft 7 1/2 in)	Meiktila	
(Kayin State) Hpa-An	Amelia	25	1.75 m (5 ft 9 in)		Top 16
(Kachin State) Hpakant	Pyae Kaung Su Thant	27	1.78 m (5 ft 10 in)	Pakokku	Top 11
(Kayin State) Kawkareik	Lily	27	1.68 m (5 ft 6 in)		Top 16
(Shan State) Kengtung	Amara Bo	26	1.81 m (5 ft 11 1/2 in)	Mandalay	Miss Universe Myanmar 2023
(Shan State) Kutkai	Mai Zin Latt	27	1.73 m (5 ft 8 in)	Muse	
(Mandalay Region) Kyaukse	Ei Shwe Eain	18	1.67 m (5 ft 5 1/2 in)		
(Shan State) Lashio	Rosa	23	1.70 m (5 ft 7 in)	Myitkyina	
(Mandalay Region) Mandalay	Wutt Hmone Han	21	1.63 m (5 ft 4 in)	Mandalay	Top 16
(Mon State) Mawlamyine	Dee	27	1.71 m (5 ft 7 1/2 in)	Thanbyuzayat	1st runner-up
(Mandalay Region) Meiktila	Su Myat Noe	21	1.68 m (5 ft 6 in)		
(Mandalay Region) Mogok	Saung Hay Man	20	1.68 m (5 ft 6 in)	Myitkyina	Top 16
(Sagaing Region) Monywa	Yu Wadi Aung	23	1.80 m (5 ft 11 in)		
(Shan State) Muse	Seng Pan Htoi	20	1.72 m (5 ft 7 1/2 in)	Muse	Top 16
(Kachin State) Myitkyina	Rose Seng Htoi	23	1.68 m (5 ft 6 in)	Myitkyina	Top 11
Naypyitaw	Sasha Viola	24	1.67 m (5 ft 5 1/2 in)	Yangon	Top 11
(Ayeyarwady Region) Pathein	No No May	20	1.67 m (5 ft 5 1/2 in)	Yangon	4th runner-up
(Bago Region) Pyay	May Thinzar	18	1.62 m (5 ft 4 in)	Yangon	
Pyinmana	Kyi Phyu Khin	27	1.70 m (5 ft 7 in)	Yangon	
(Mandalay Region) Pyin Oo Lwin	Thin Sandar Pyae Thiha Aung	22	1.63 m (5 ft 4 in)	Pyin Oo Lwin	5th runner-up
(Rakhine State) Sittwe	Saw Myat Ei Khine	23	1.68 m (5 ft 6 in)	Sittwe	Top 11
(Shan State) Tachileik	Nang Nandar Linn	19	1.70 m (5 ft 7 in)	Tachileik	3rd runner-up
(Shan State) Taunggyi	Hsu Myat Thu	20	1.65 m (5 ft 5 in)	Yangon	Top 11
(Bago Region) Taungoo	Ei Kha Kha Mon	20	1.68 m (5 ft 6 in)	Taungoo	
(Yangon Region) East Yangon	Pandra	22	1.68 m (5 ft 6 in)	Lawksawk	
(Yangon Region) North Yangon	Phyu Zin Thant	18	1.67 m (5 ft 5 1/2 in)	Yangon	
(Yangon Region) South Yangon	El Linn	22	1.70 m (5 ft 7 in)	Yangon	

=== Replacements ===
- (Chin State) Falam – Htoo Wint Thandar, Miss Universe Falam 2023 withdrew for personal reasons. Her 1st Runner up, Khun Sett Cho replaced it for the event.

=== Withdrawals ===
- (Magway Region) Magway – no contestant.
- (Shan State) Kyaukme – Lway Hseng Nom withdrew due to her personal reasons.
- (Mon State) Thaton – Phoo Pwint Sone withdrew due to her mother's unstable health.
- (Mandalay Region) Yamethin – Chuu Chuu Kaung San withdrew due to her health condition.
- (Yangon Region) West Yangon – Yoon Thiri Naing withdrew due to her education matters.

== Crossovers and returnees ==
Contestants who competed in editions of Miss Universe Myanmar and other local and international beauty pageants with their respective placements:

=== City pageants ===
Miss Grand Yangon

- 2024: Kyi Phyu Khin (1st runner-up)
- 2024: Yu Wadi Aung (Top 20)
- 2024: Phyu Zin Thant (Unplaced)

Miss Universe Yamethin

- 2023:Yoon May Aung (2nd runner-up)

Miss Universe Myitkyina

- 2023:Rosa Tinggaw Ji San (4th runner-up)

Miss Universe Mawlamyine

- 2017: Dee (2nd runner-up)

Miss Tsai Lat (Miss Laiza)

- 2023:Saung Hay Hman (Winner)
- 2020:Rosa Tinngaw Ji San (Winner)

Miss Golden Land Yangon Region

- 2019: Sasha Viola (Winner - Yangon (North))

Miss Golden Land Magway Region

- 2016: Pyae Kaung Su THant (1st runner-up)

=== National Pageants ===
Miss Universe Myanmar

- 2022: Amara Bo (Top 10)
- 2022: Sasha Viola (Top 10)

Miss Earth Myanmar

- 2022: Kyi Phyu Khin (2nd runner-up (Miss Earth Myanmar Water))

Miss Myanmar World

- 2018: Kyi Phyu Khin (N/A)
- 2018: Pyae Kaung Su Thant (Unplaced)

=== International Pageants ===
Miss Tourism of the Globe

- 2018: Pyae Kaung Su Thant (Unplaced)
