= Miss Universe Myanmar 2024 =

2024 beauty pageant in Myanmar

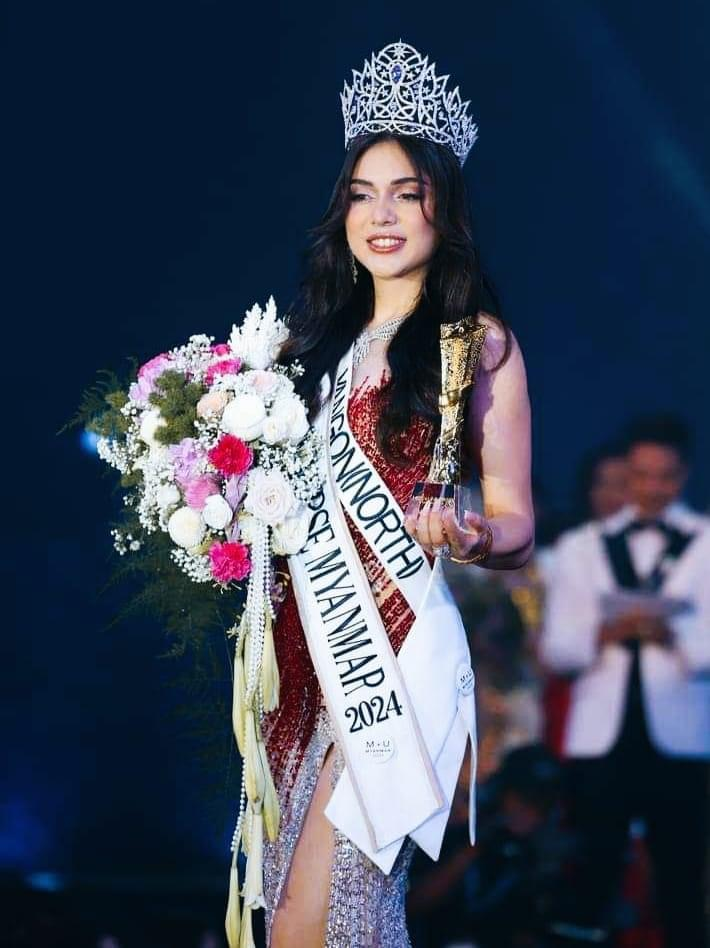
- Thet San Andersen, Miss Universe Myanmar 2024
- Date: 7 June 2024
- Presenters: Charlie; San Thut
- Entertainment: Vitashine
- Venue: Yangon Convention Center, Yangon, Myanmar
- Broadcaster: Skynet Teen Channel
- Entrants: 52
- Placements: 20
- Debuts: Aunglan; Hinthada; Innwa; Intagaw; Kalaw; Kawthaung; Kyaikto; Kyaukpadaung; Mudon; Myingyan; Nawnghkio; Shwegu; Shwegyin; Waingmaw; Yamethin
- Withdrawals: Amarapura; Kawkareik; Kutkai; Monywa; Muse; Pyinmana; Dawei
- Returns: Bagan; Hlaingbwe; Magway; Minbu; Myawaddy; Pakokku; Pindaya; Sagaing; Tha Htone; West Yangon
- Winner: Thet San Andersen (Yangon Region) North Yangon
- Best National Costume: Han Lay; (Yangon Region) South Yangon; Nang Laung Lieng; (Shan State) Tachileik
- Photogenic: Myo Thandar Zaw (Bago Region) Bago

Miss Universe Myanmar 2024 was the eleventh Miss Universe Myanmar pageant, held at the Yangon Convention Center in Yangon, Myanmar, on 7 June 2024.

Amara Bo of Keng Tung crowned Thet San Andersen of North Yangon her successor at the end of event. Thet San will represent Myanmar at Miss Universe 2024 in Mexico City, Mexico.

== Background ==
=== Selection of participants ===
The 2024 edition saw the debut of Aunglan, Hinthada, Innwa, Intagaw, Kalaw, Kawthaung, Kyaikto, Kyaukpadaung, Mudon, Myingyan, Nawnghkio, Shwegu, Shwegyin, Waingmaw and Yamethin.

Bagan previously competed in 2018. Whereas, Hlaingbwe, Magway, Minbu, Myawaddy, Pakokku, Pindaya, Sagaing, Thaton and West Yangon last competed in 2020.

=== Withdrawals ===
Out of the original 55 contestants, Miss Universe Amarapura, May December, Miss Universe Monywa, Shwe Yati Kyaw, and Miss Universe Muse, Nyein Htet Htet Wai withdrew from the competition for personal reasons.

=== City preliminary contests ===
The following is a list of the City or District that held the local preliminary contests for the Miss Universe Myanmar 2024 pageant.

List of Miss Universe Myanmar 2024 city pageants, by the coronation date
Host city/district	Pageant	Date & Venue	Entrants	Title(s)	Ref.
(Shan State) Kalaw	Miss Universe Kalaw	16 February at KMA Shwe Pyi Bago Resort, Bago	14	2 titles: Miss Universe Intagaw; Miss Universe Kalaw	
(Ayeyarwady Region) Pathein	Miss Universe Pathein	20 February at Ruby Hall, Pathein	15	2 titles: Miss Universe Hinthada; Miss Universe Pathein	
(Mon State) Mawlamyine	Miss Universe Mawlamyine, Mudon & Thahtone	2 March at Golden River Hotel, Mawlamyine	15	3 titles: Miss Universe Mawlamyine; Miss Universe Mudon; Miss Universe Thahtone	
(Shan State) Taunggyi	Miss Universe Taunggyi	5 March at Royal Taunggyi Hotel, Taunggyi	22	3 titles: Miss Universe Aungban; Miss Universe Lashio; Miss Universe Taunggyi	
(Bago Region) Bago	Miss Universe Bago & Sittwe	9 March at Shwe Thar Hlaune Hall, Bago	12	3 titles: Miss Universe Bago; Miss Universe Shwegyin; Miss Universe Sittwe	
(Shan State) Tachileik	Miss Universe Tachileik	12 March at Tachileik	15	2 titles: Miss Universe Keng Tung; Miss Universe Tachileik	
(Bago Region) Taungoo	Miss Universe Taungoo	19 March at Taungoo	10	1 title: Miss Universe Taungoo	
(Mandalay Region) Amarapura	Miss Universe Amarapura & Monywa	21 March at Mandalay Hotel, Mandalay	10	2 titles: Miss Universe Amarapura; Miss Universe Monywa	
(Kachin State) Myitkyina	Miss Universe Myitkyina	24 March at Manau Park, Myitkyina	12	1 title: Miss Universe Myitkyina	
(Bago Region) Pyay	Miss Universe Pyay	24 March at Alinkar Resort, Pyay	21	2 titles: Miss Universe Aunglan; Miss Universe Pyay	
(Mon State) Kyaikto	Miss Universe Kyaikto, Kyaukpadaung & Thanbyuzayat	26 March at Popa Garden Resort, Bagan	12	4 titles: Miss Universe Bagan; Miss Universe Kyaikto; Miss Universe Kyaukpadaung; Miss Universe Thanbyuzayat	
(Kayin State) Myawaddy	Miss Universe Myawaddy	26 March at Myawaddy	10	1 title: Miss Universe Myawaddy	
(Mandalay Region) Meiktila	Miss Universe Meiktila & Innwa	27 March at Swallow Hotel, Mandalay	21	7 titles: Miss Universe Innwa; Miss Universe Kyaukse; Miss Universe Meiktila; Miss Universe Minbu; Miss Universe Myingyan; Miss Universe Nawnghkio; Miss Universe Yamethin	
Naypyitaw	Miss Universe Naypyitaw, Mogok, & Hakha	24 March at Jasmine Hotel, Nay Pyi Taw	13	4 titles: Miss Universe Falam; Miss Universe Hakha; Miss Universe Mogok; Miss Universe Naypyitaw	
(Mandalay Region) Mandalay	Miss Universe Mandalay	2 April at Thazin Grand Ballroom, Mingalar Mandalay Hotel, Mandalay	17	4 titles: Miss Universe Mandalay; Miss Universe Muse; Miss Universe Pakokku; Miss Universe Pyin Oo Lwin	
(Yangon Region) Yangon	Miss Universe Yangon	4 April at Wyndham Grand Hotel, Yangon	17	6 titles: Miss Universe Kawthaung; Miss Universe Pindaya; Miss Universe Yangon (East); Miss Universe Yangon (West); Miss Universe Yangon (South); Miss Universe Yangon (North)	
(Kayin State) Hpa-an	Miss Universe Hpa-an	6 April at Hpa-an	17	2 titles: Miss Universe Hlaingbwe; Miss Universe Hpa-an	
(Kachin State) Bhamo	Miss Universe Bhamo	7 April at Friendship Hotel, Bhamo	15	2 titles: Miss Universe Bhamo; Miss Universe Shwegu	
(Kachin State) Waingmaw	Miss Universe Waingmaw	9 April at Manau Shingnip Bar and Restaurant, Myitkyina	24	2 titles: Miss Universe Hpakant; Miss Universe Waingmaw	
(Magway Region) Magway	Miss Universe Magway	24 April at Magway	12	1 title: Miss Universe Magway	

== Results ==
Color keys

- The contestant Won in an International pageant.
- The contestant was a Runner-up in an International pageant.
- The contestant was a Semi-Finalist in an International pageant.
- The contestant assumed another title.
- The contestant was not able to compete in an International pageant.
- The contestant did not place but won a Special Award in the pageant.
- The contestant did not place.

Final results	Contestant	International pageant	International Results
Miss Universe Myanmar 2024 (Winner)	(Yangon Region) North Yangon – Thet San Andersen	Miss Universe 2024	Unplaced
1st runner-up	(Mandalay Region) Meiktila – Cherry Moe	Miss Supranational 2025	Unplaced
2nd runner-up	(Yangon Region) South Yangon - Han Lay		
3rd runner-up	(Mon State) Mawlamyine – Eaint Myat Chal		
4th runner-up	(Bago Region) Taungoo – Thaw Dar Sun §	Miss Earth 2024	Unplaced
5th runner-up	(Kachin State) Myitkyina – Mary Htoi Ra	Miss Charm 2024	Did not compete
Top 10	(Bago Region) Bago – Myo Thandar Zaw		
Top 10	(Kayin State) Hpa-An – Yin May Hnin	Face of Beauty International 2024	Unplaced
Top 10	(Ayeyarwady Region) Pathein – Ti Aye		
Top 10	(Shan State) Taunggyi – Shin Yoon Eain		
Top 20	(Shan State) Kalaw – Pandora Htoo		
Top 20	(Tanintharyi Region) Kawthaung – Phyo Thinzar Zaw		
Top 20	(Mon State) Kyaikto – Wint Yadanar Linn		
Top 20	(Mandalay Region) Mandalay - Sharr Hnin Si		
Top 20	(Kayin State) Myawaddy – Ahtin Kaya Popo	Miss Grand Myanmar 2025	1st Runner Up
Top 20	(Mandalay Region) Pyin Oo Lwin – Per Pe		
Top 20	(Rakhine State) Sittwe – Aye Chan Myint Moe		
Top 20	(Shan State) Tachileik – Nang Laung Lieng		
Top 20	(Kachin State) Waingmaw – Nan Aye Kham Sung		
Top 20	(Yangon Region) East Yangon – Zin Moe Pyae		

§ – Bigo Live Myanmar Voting

== Awards ==
=== Special awards ===
Award	Contestant
Best National Costume	(Shan State) Tachileik - Nang Laung Lieng ‡; (Yangon Region) South Yangon - Han Lay
Miss Attractive	(Mandalay Region) Meiktila - Cherry Moe
Miss Astonishing	(Yangon Region) North Yangon - Thet San Andersen
Best Beauty	(Mandalay Region) Meiktila - Cherry Moe
Miss Fashionable	(Yangon Region) North Yangon - Thet San Andersen
Miss Photogenic	(Bago Region) Bago - Myo Thandar Zaw
Miss Popular Choice	(Mandalay Region) Meiktila - Cherry Moe
Miss Perfect Body	(Yangon Region) North Yangon - Thet San Andersen
Miss Healthy Skin	(Shan State) Tachileik - Nang Laung Lieng
Miss Golden Ratio	(Yangon Region) North Yangon - Thet San Andersen
Miss Sportswear	(Shan State) Taunggyi - Shin Yoon Eain
Best Catwalk	(Yangon Region) South Yangon - Han Lay
Miss Beauty Icon	(Yangon Region) South Yangon - Han Lay
Miss Stunning	(Yangon Region) South Yangon - Han Lay
Miss Gorgeous	(Yangon Region) North Yangon - Thet San Andersen
Miss Elegant	(Yangon Region) North Yangon - Thet San Andersen
Miss Beautiful Smile	(Mon State) Mawlamyine - Eaint Myat Chal
Best in Evening Gown	(Kayin State) Hpa-An - Yin May Hnin

=== Challenge winners ===
Title		Candidate
Best National Costume	Winner	(Yangon Region) South Yangon - Han Lay
Best National Costume	People's Choice Winner	(Shan State) Tachileik - Nang Laung Lieng
Best National Costume	Top 5	(Shan State) Keng Tung - Nang Tip; (Mon State) Mawlamyine - Eaint Myat Chal; (Yangon Region) East Yangon - Zin Moe Pyae; (Yangon Region) North Yangon - Thet San Andersen
Glamorous Universe		(Shan State) Kalaw - Pandora Htoo; (Mon State) Mawlamyine - Eaint Myat Chal

=== Miss Popular Vote ===
The winner of the "Miss Popular Vote" was determined via a public voting on the Bigo Live app with the voting page for Miss Universe Myanmar, held on 7 June in Yangon.

Final Top 10 Reveal 7 June 2024
Rank	+/-	Contestant
1	▲	(Bago Region) Taungoo - Thaw Dar Sun
2	▲	(Mon State) Thanbyuzayat - Khin Popo Htet
3	▼2	(Yangon Region) East Yangon - Zin Moe Pyae
4	▲	(Kayin State) Myawaddy - Ahtin Kaya Popo
5	▲	(Bago Region) Bago - Myo Thandar Zaw
6	▲	(Shan State) Tachileik - Nang Laung Lieng
7	▼5	(Mandalay Region) Mandalay - Sharr Hnin Si
8	▲	(Mon State) Kyaikto - Wint Yadanar Linn
9	▼6	(Shan State) Aungban - Wan Wan
10	▲	(Yangon Region) South Yangon - Han Lay

First Top 10 Reveal 30 May 2024
Rank	+/-	Contestant
1	Steady	(Yangon Region) East Yangon - Zin Moe Pyae
2	Steady	(Mandalay Region) Mandalay - Sharr Hnin Si
3	Steady	(Shan State) Aungban - Wan Wan
4	Steady	(Mon State) Tha Htone - Nwe Ni Winn
5	Steady	(Kachin State) Hpakant - Lu Lu Ing
6	Steady	(Bago Region) Intagaw - Yoon Myat Shwe Yee
7	Steady	(Mandalay Region) Yamethin - Thoon Mhi Mhi Zaw
8	Steady	(Kachin State) Myitkyina - Mary Htoi Ra
9	Steady	(Bago Region) Pyay - Myat Su Mon
10	Steady	(Shan State) Nawnghkio - Pann Moh Moh

== Contestants ==
52 contestants have been confirmed to participate, all representatives represent on the city level.

City/District	Candidates	Age (Note: Ages at the time of the pageant)	Height	Hometown	Placement
(Shan State) Aungban	Wan Wan (Htoo Htoo Htin Aung)	20	1.63 m (5 ft 4 in)	Taunggyi	
(Magway Region) Aunglan	Chit May Noe Oo	21	1.70 m (5 ft 7 in)	Pyay	
(Mandalay Region) Bagan	Aye Thazin Win Thaung			Hinthada	
(Bago Region) Bago	Myo Thandar Zaw			Mandalay	Top 10
(Kachin State) Bhamo	Swe Swe Win	24	1.68 m (5 ft 6 in)		
(Chin State) Falam	Siang Za Hnem Par (Irene Kardia)			Yangon	
(Chin State) Hakha	May Phoo Myint Moel			Yangon	
(Ayeyarwady Region) Hinthada	Hsu Pyae Sone Htun	24	1.68 m (5 ft 6 in)	Kanaung	
(Kayin State) Hlaingbwe	Naw Thu Thu Yin				
(Kayin State) Hpa-An	Yin May Hnin			Taunggyi	Top 10
(Kachin State) Hpakant	Lu Lu Ing	20	1.73 m (5 ft 8 in)	Myitkyina	
(Mandalay Region) Innwa	Nay Chi Tint Wai				
(Bago Region) Intagaw	Yoon Myat Shwe Yee	21	1.70 m (5 ft 7 in)	Yangon	
(Shan State) Kalaw	Pandora Htoo	24	1.68 m (5 ft 6 in)	Yangon	Top 20
(Tanintharyi Region) Kawthaung	Phyo Thinzar Zaw	24	1.68 m (5 ft 6 in)	Yangon	Top 20
(Shan State) Kengtung	Nang Tip			Tachileik	
(Mon State) Kyaikto	Wint Yadanar Linn				Top 20
(Mandalay Region) Kyaukpadaung	Honey Phyo				
(Mandalay Region) Kyaukse	Thee Thee Sapyit Cho		1.63 m (5 ft 4 in)	Mandalay	
(Shan State) Lashio	Mhuu Kitt San	21	1.65 m (5 ft 5 in)		
(Magway Region) Magway	Htet Htet Zaw				
(Mandalay Region) Mandalay	Sharr Hnin Si				Top 20
(Mon State) Mawlamyine	Eaint Myat Chal	30	1.73 m (5 ft 8 in)	Chaungzon	3rd runner-up
(Mandalay Region) Meiktila	Cherry Moe	23	1.73 m (5 ft 8 in)	Mandalay	1st runner-up
(Magway Region) Minbu	Zin Yu Nwe				
(Mandalay Region) Mogok	Poe Eaindray Khit	29		Yangon	
(Mon State) Mudon	Yu Mon Aung			Yangon	
(Kayin State) Myawaddy	Ahtin Kaya Popo			Yangon	Top 20
(Mandalay Region) Myingyan	Thi Thi Kyaw Khine				
(Kachin State) Myitkyina	Mary Htoi Ra				5th runner-up
(Shan State) Nawnghkio	Pann Moh Moh				
Naypyitaw	Phoo Pyae Sone Khine			Yangon	
(Magway Region) Pakokku	Shwe Yee Aung				
(Ayeyarwady Region) Pathein	Ti Aye	23	1.68 m (5 ft 6 in)	Pathein	Top 10
(Shan State) Pindaya	Arr Put				
(Bago Region) Pyay	Myat Su Mon	19	1.63 m (5 ft 4 in)	Pyay	
(Mandalay Region) Pyin Oo Lwin	Per Pe				Top 20
(Sagaing Region) Sagaing	Haylar				
(Kachin State) Shwegu	May Myint Mo	21	1.70 m (5 ft 7 in)	Bhamo	
(Bago Region) Shwegyin	Thiri Theint Theint Thone				
(Rakhine State) Sittwe	Aye Chan Myint Mo (Win Win Than)			Rathedaung	Top 20
(Shan State) Tachileik	Nang Laung Lieng			Kengtung	Top 20
(Shan State) Taunggyi	Shin Yoon Eain	22	1.70 m (5 ft 7 in)	Yangon	Top 10
(Bago Region) Taungoo	Thaw Dar Sun	18		Mandalay	4th runner-up
(Mon State) Thanbyuzayat	Khin Popo Htet (Khit Hsu San)				
(Mon State) Tha Htone	Nwe Ni Winn	25	1.70 m (5 ft 7 in)	Yangon	
(Kachin State) Waingmaw	Nan Aye Kham Sung	16	1.68 m (5 ft 6 in)	Waingmaw	Top 20
(Mandalay Region) Yamethin	Thoon Mhi Mhi Zaw				
(Yangon Region) East Yangon	Zin Moe Pyae			Yangon	Top 20
(Yangon Region) North Yangon	Thet San Andersen	27	1.73 m (5 ft 8 in)	Yangon	Miss Universe Myanmar 2024
(Yangon Region) South Yangon	Han Lay	31	1.73 m (5 ft 8 in)	Muse	2nd runner-up
(Yangon Region) West Yangon	Aye Pyae Wai Aung				

=== Replacements ===
- (Kachin State) Bhamo – Nwe Yein Ti, Miss Universe Bhamo 2024 withdrew for personal reasons. Swe Swe Win replaced her for the event.

=== Withdrawals ===
- (Tanintharyi Region) Dawei – no contest.
- (Ayeyarwady Region) Myaungmya – no contest.
- (Mandalay Region) Amarapura – May December withdrew for personal reasons.
- (Sagaing Region) Monywa – Shwe Yati Kyaw withdrew for personal reasons.
- (Shan State) Muse – Nyein Htet Htet Wai withdrew for personal reasons.

== Crossovers and returnees ==
Contestants who competed in editions of Miss Universe Myanmar and other local and international beauty pageants with their respective placements:

=== City pageants ===
Miss Universe Mandalay

- 2015: Han Lay (Winner)

Miss Imperial Universe Mandalay

- 2018: Myo Thandar Zaw (Winner)

Miss Universe Naypyitaw

- 2018: Phoo Pyae Sone Khine (N/A)

Miss Universe Yangon

- 2020: Nwe Ni Winn (N/A)
- 2023: Ahtin Kaya Popo (did not compete)
- 2023: Yu Mon Aung (Unplaced)
- 2023: Zin Moe Pyae (Top 12)

Miss Grand Yangon

- 2024: Phyo Thinzar Zaw (Top 14) (appointed Miss Grand Kyaikto)

=== National Pageants ===
Miss Golden Land Myanmar

- 2014: Eaint Myat Chal (1st runner-up)
- 2015: Eaint Myat Chal (Winner - Miss Earth Myanmar)

Miss Universe Myanmar

- 2015/2016: Han Lay (1st runner-up)
- 2020: Poe Eaindray Khit (Unplaced (as Falam))

Miss Teen Imperial Universe Myanmar

- 2018: Myo Thandar Zaw (Winner)

Miss World Myanmar

- 2018: May Phoo Myint Moel (Unplaced)

Miss Earth Myanmar

- 2020: Cherry Moe (Unplaced)
- 2020: Nwe Ni Winn (Top 13 (as Mandalay))
- 2022: Nwe Ni Winn (1st runner-up (Miss Earth Myanmar Air)) (soon appointed Winner)

Miss Grand Myanmar

- 2024: Phyo Thinzar Zaw (Unplaced (as Kyaikto))

=== International Pageants ===
Miss Earth

- 2015: Eaint Myat Chal (Unplaced)

Miss Landscapes International

- 2018: Cherry Moe (Unplaced)

Miss Supranational

- 2019: Eaint Myat Chal (Unplaced)
