= Thet San Andersen =

Burmese model and beauty queen

- သက်စံအန်ဒါဆန်
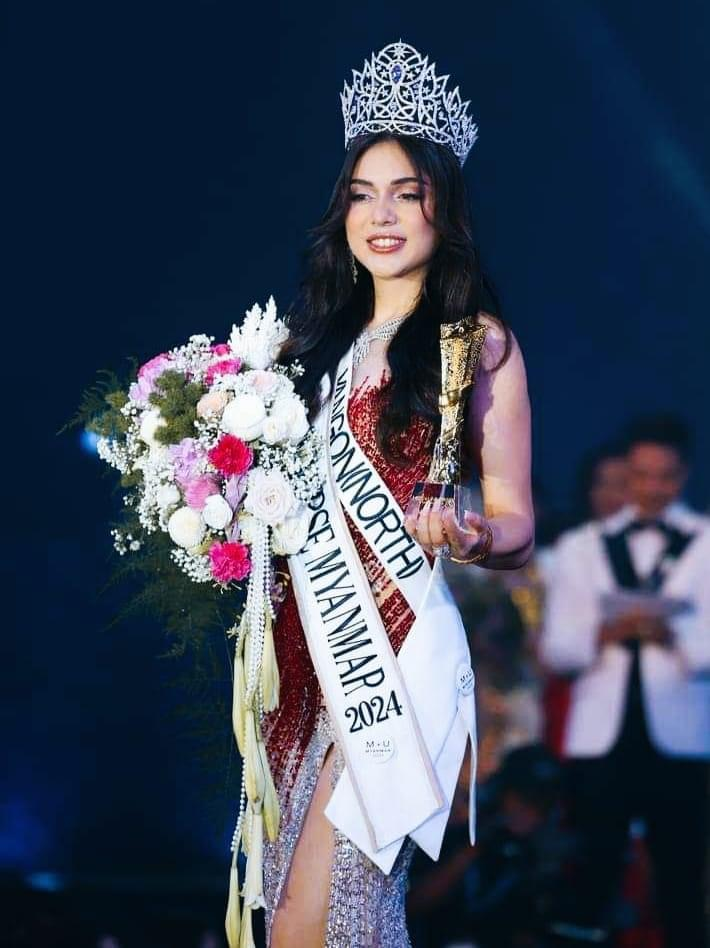
- Thet San Andersen, Miss Universe Myanmar 2024
- Born: 23 May 1997 (age 29); Yangon, Myanmar
- Education: Dagon University
- Occupation: Model
- Beauty pageant titleholder
- Title: Miss Universe Myanmar 2024
- Years active: 2024–present
- Hair color: Black
- Eye color: Black
- Major competitions: Miss Universe Myanmar 2024; (Winner); Miss Universe 2024; (Unplaced); MGI All Stars 1st Edition; (Top 18); (Best in Portrait Challenge Award Winner)

Thet San Andersen ( သက်စံအန်ဒါဆန် ; born 23 May 1997) is a Burmese-Swedish model and beauty pageant titleholder who was crowned Miss Universe Myanmar 2024. She represented Myanmar at the Miss Universe 2024 competition held in Mexico.

During the competition, she gained significant recognition for her advocacy projects and social media presence. She ranked 16th in the "Voice for Change" fan vote category. Additionally, she was honored by Mahidol University prior to the international competition for her contributions.

== Pageantry ==
=== Miss Universe Myanmar 2024 ===
Thet San Andersen was crowned winner of the Miss Universe Myanmar 2024 pageant held in Yangon on June 7, 2024. During the national competition, she originally represented North Yangon. Her victory earned her the right to represent the country on the global stage.

=== Miss Universe 2024 ===
As the official representative of Myanmar, she traveled to Mexico to compete in the 73rd edition of the Miss Universe pageant. She competed against contestants from over 120 countries, showcasing her advocacy and Myanmar's cultural heritage to an international audience.

=== MGI All Stars ===
In early 2026, Andersen was officially confirmed as the representative for Myanmar in the inaugural edition of the MGI All Stars competition. Organized by the Miss Grand International organization, this specialized pageant is designed as a platform for prominent former titleholders from various international pageant systems to compete again.

Andersen competed alongside other high-profile international beauty queens, including former Miss Universe Philippines Gazini Ganados. She ended up in the top 18 after winning the Portrait Challenge Award.

She was also a judge at the Miss Earth Myanmar 2026 competition.
