= MGI All Stars 1st Edition =

First edition of the MGI All Stars competition

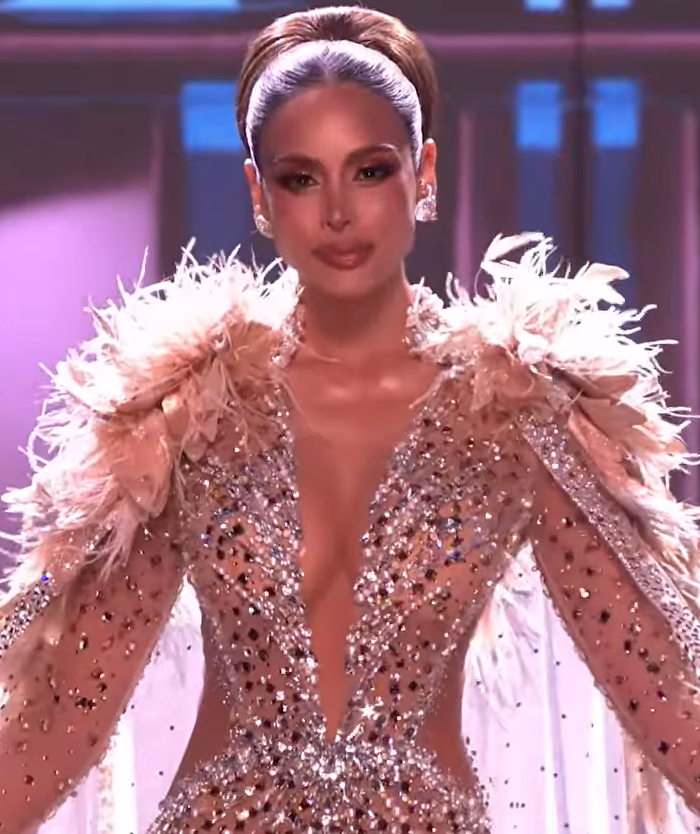
- Vanessa Pulgarín
- Date: 30 May 2026
- Presenters: Danilo Carrera; Emma Tiglao; Michelle Dee
- Venue: MGI Hall, Bangkok, Thailand
- Entrants: 56
- Placements: 18
- Winner: Vanessa Pulgarin; Colombia

External videos
- MGI All Stars 1st Edition Finals
- 2026 MGI All Stars 1st Edition Finals (Archived version) by MGI PCL

External videos
- Preliminary Round 1 (Evening Gown)
- Preliminary Round 1 (Bare Face)
- Preliminary Round 2 (Swimsuit)
- Preliminary Round 2 (Runway)
- Grand Final (Youtube version)

MGI All Stars 1st Edition Logo

The Top 5 finalists at MGI All Stars 1st Edition

MGI All Stars 1st Edition was the inaugural edition of the MGI All Stars pageant, held on 30 May 2026 in Bangkok, Thailand. Organized by the Miss Grand International Organization, the competition serves as a spin-off of Miss Grand International, featuring former beauty queens and contestants from national and international pageants, including past Miss Grand International delegates.

A total of 56 contestants competed in the inaugural edition. At the conclusion of the event, Vanessa Pulgarin of Colombia was crowned the first MGI All Stars winner, defeating Faith Maria Porter of Ghana and Hương Giang of Vietnam, who finished as the first and second runners-up, respectively. Pulgarín is expected to return for the second edition to defend her title.

The competition attracted attention for its open scoring format, in which judges' scores and audience voting were displayed in real time, as well as for technical disruptions affecting the online voting system during the Grand Final, prompting concerns from contestants and pageant observers regarding accessibility and transparency.

== Background ==
On 4 December 2025, the Miss Grand International Organization announced the launch of its inaugural "All Stars" edition.

=== Location and date ===
On 7 December 2025, Miss Grand International officially announced that Bangkok, Thailand, will host the first MGI All Stars pageant. The event was originally scheduled to begin on 25 January, with contestants earning scores through various activities and challenges and the Grand Final was planned on 13 February in Thailand.

However, on 24 December 2025, the Miss Grand International Organization rescheduled the inaugural All Stars edition. The decision was made due to extension of New Year holiday period, which could cause visa processing delays for participants from several countries. Miss Grand International Organization also confirmed that all previously announced contestants will remain eligible.

On 10 January 2026, the Miss Grand International Organization officially announced the final schedule. The event will take place from 18 May to 30 May, with the Grand Final planned for 30 May 2026.

=== Schedule ===
On 8 April 2026, the Miss Grand International Organization announced their official activities during the competition, which are included;

MGI All Stars 1st Edition: Schedule of Activities
Date	Event	Location
May 16–17	Arrival Day / Registration / Photo Shooting	Bangkok, Thailand
May 18	Activity "Taste of Thai" / Cooking Class	Bangkok, Thailand
May 19	Activity "Dress of Thai" / Visit Wat Arun / Dinner on Cruise	Bangkok, Thailand
May 20	Welcome All the Stars & Sashing Ceremony	Bangkok, Thailand
May 21–23	Activity at "Damnoen Saduak, Ratchaburi"	Damnoen Saduak, Ratchaburi
May 24	Rehearsal	Bangkok, Thailand
May 26	Interview Round / Portrait Challenge	Bangkok, Thailand
May 27	Preliminary Round 1 (Evening Gown Competition / Bare Face Competition)	Bangkok, Thailand
May 28	Preliminary Round 2 (Swimsuit Competition / Runway Challenge)	Bangkok, Thailand
May 29	Rehearsal	Bangkok, Thailand
May 30	Final Competition	Bangkok, Thailand

=== Selection of participants ===
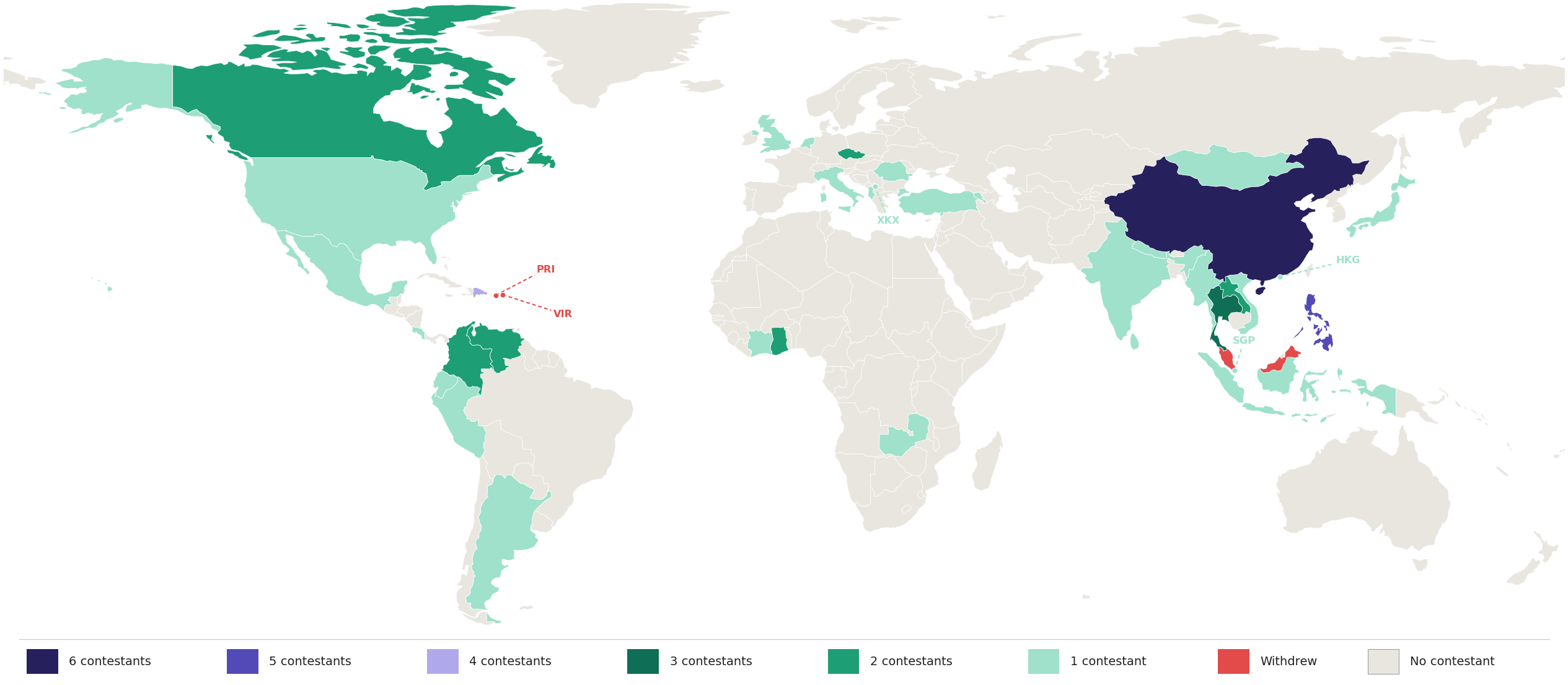
Number of contestants by country and territory in the first edition of MGI All Stars

The competition is open to cisgender women and transgender women aged 18 to 40 who have previously competed in international beauty pageants, including past Miss Grand International contestants and titleholders from other pageant systems. Married women and mothers are also eligible to compete.

==== Withdrawals ====
Melisha Lin of Malaysia, Nadyalee Torres of Puerto Rico, Talisha White of the United States Virgin Islands, were initially confirmed to compete, but later withdrew without replacements being appointed, reducing the final number of participants to 56.

==== Replacements ====
Sthefany Gutiérrez of Venezuela was originally scheduled to compete. However, she later withdrew due to personal reasons and was replaced by Gabriela de la Cruz.

=== Crown and prizes ===
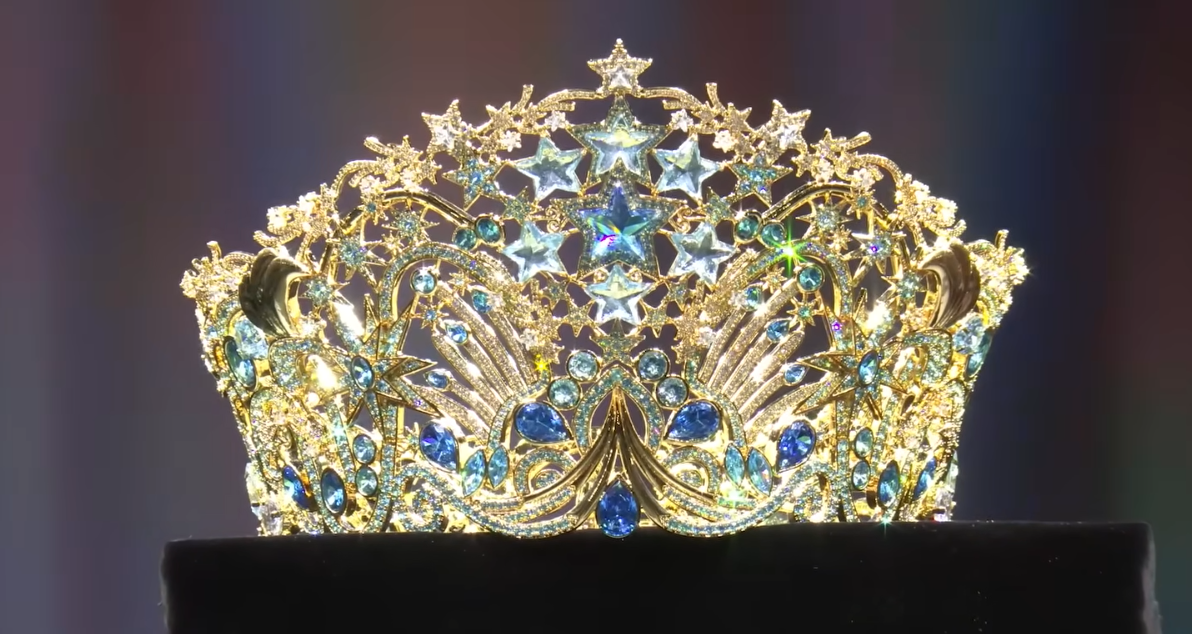
The All Stars Crown for the inaugural edition of MGI All Stars.

MGI confirmed that the winner of the first edition will receive the MGI All Stars crown, and a cash prize ranging from US$100,000 to US$1,000,000. According to the announced prize structure, the winner of this edition will receive the first installment of US$50,000 following the coronation night, while the remaining US$50,000 will be granted upon her return to compete and defend her title in the subsequent edition, regardless of the competition outcome. Should the titleholder successfully secure another victory, an additional cash prize of US$100,000 will be awarded. Furthermore, a bonus prize of US$1,000,000 will be granted if the titleholder achieves three consecutive victories.

The crown for the inaugural edition, known as the All Stars Crown, was designed by Beauty Star and unveiled by Miss Grand International president Nawat Itsaragrisil during the Welcome All the Stars opening ceremony, held on 19 May 2026 in Bangkok, Thailand. The crown is awarded as a prize distinct from the annual Miss Grand International crown and is not regarded as a successor title to the reigning Miss Grand International.

== Results ==
=== Placements ===
Placement	Contestant
MGI All Stars	Colombia – Vanessa Pulgarin
1st Runner-Up	Ghana – Faith Maria Porter
2nd Runner-Up	Vietnam – Hương Giang (Note: Automatically advanced to the Top 18 as the World's Choice Awardee)
Top 5	Czech Republic – Mariana Bečková; Philippines – Gazini Ganados
Top 10	Colombia – Priscilla Londoño; Dominican Republic – Yamilex Hernández; Peru – Suheyn Cipriani; Thailand – Tharina Botes; Venezuela – Gabriela de la Cruz
Top 18	China – Zewen Qin; Dominican Republic – Nicole Puello; Ecuador – Samantha Quenedit; Mexico – Francia Cortés; Mongolia – Azzaya Tsogt-Ochir (Note: Automatically advanced to the Top 18 as the Runway Challenge Winner); Myanmar – Thet San Andersen (Note: Automatically advanced to the Top 18 as the Portrait Challenge Winner); Philippines – Fuschia Anne Ravena; Venezuela – Isabella Santiago

==== Final Scores ====
The K value varied across competition stages: a benchmark of 100,000 votes was applied to the Top 18 and Top 10 rounds, 299,000 votes to the Top 5 round, and 99,000 votes to the Top 3 round. The K value was automatically adjusted by the system according to the voting volume of each respective round. Changes in the benchmark reflected fluctuations in voting activity; for instance, the benchmark for the Top 5 round increased to nearly three times the earlier level following a substantial rise in the highest voting expenditure recorded.

The following table presents the raw scores from both the judges and public voting, which were subsequently converted into total points based on the organizer's scoring system.

Contestant	Swimsuit			Evening Gown			Top 5 Q&A			Final Vote		
Contestant	Judges	Vote	Total	Judges	Vote	Total	Judges	Vote	Total	Judges	Vote	Total
Vanessa Pulgarin	9.78	158	(2) 6.85	9.25	12,800	(4) 6.86	8.70	30,913	(3) 6.40	9.23	17,249	(1) 6.98
Faith Maria Porter	9.61	125	(4) 6.73	9.63	3,748	(5) 6.85	9.50	131	(1) 6.65	9.86	140	(2) 6.91
Hương Giang	8.64	32,860	(1) 7.03	9.81	36,695	(1) 7.97	8.31	64,410	(2) 6.46	8.40	26,524	(3) 6.68
Mariana Bečková	9.18	40	(8) 6.42	9.88	174	(3) 6.93	9.00	2,194	(4) 6.32			
Gazini Ganados	9.49	709	(5) 6.66	9.38	13,208	(2) 6.97	8.90	2,875	(5) 6.26			
Tharina Botes	9.71	1,509	(3) 6.84	9.69	2,152	(6) 6.85						
Suheyn Cipriani	8.91	831	(10) 6.26	9.21	1,838	(7) 6.50						
Yamilex Hernández	9.16	118	(9) 6.42	9.30	1,146	(8) 6.50						
Gabriela de la Cruz	9.38	144	(6) 6.57	9.16	304	(9) 6.42						
Priscilla Londoño	9.30	4	(7) 6.51	8.94	51	(10) 6.26						
Samantha Quenedit	8.71	159	(11) 6.10									
Francia Cortés	8.55	15	(12) 5.99									
Nicole Puello	8.34	0	(13) 5.84									
Isabella Santiago	8.33	30	(14) 5.83									
Thet San Andersen	7.74	1,777	(15) 5.47									
Fuschia Anne Ravena	7.66	2,315	(16) 5.43									
Azzaya Tsogt-Ochir	7.71	0	(17) 5.40									
Zewen Qin	6.78	0	(18) 4.74									

==== Special awards ====
Award	Result	
World's Choice Award	Winner	Vietnam – Hương Giang
Portrait Challenge	Winner	Myanmar – Thet San Andersen
Portrait Challenge	Top 6	Philippines – Alexia Núñez; Mongolia – Azzaya Tsogt-Ochir; Philippines – Gazini Ganados; Ghana – Makeeba Kaaya Animpong; Thailand – Yada Theppanom
Portrait Challenge	Top 20	Canada – Angel Bhathal; China – Carry Xie; Indonesia – Dela Deniya; Ghana – Faith Maria Porter; Philippines – Fuschia Anne Ravena; Venezuela – Gabriela de la Cruz; Vietnam – Hương Giang; Czech Republic – Jana Marvanová; Philippines – Keylyn Trajano; Laos – Lattana Munvilay; Armenia – Lilia Gzraryan; China – Mika; Singapore – Qatrisha Zairyah; Colombia – Vanessa Pulgarin
Runway Challenge	Winner	Mongolia – Azzaya Tsogt-Ochir
Runway Challenge	Top 10	Philippines – Alexia Núñez; Dominican Republic – Danilka Gérman; Italy – Faddya Halabi; United Kingdom – Harriotte Lane; Philippines – Keylyn Trajano; Armenia – Lilia Gzraryan; Côte d'Ivoire – Marie Diamala; Thailand – Tharina Botes; Dominican Republic – Yamilex Hernández

== Pageant ==
=== Format ===
Participation is open to former national and international pageant contestants. The competition follows a format similar to that of Miss Grand International, featuring preliminary competitions as well as swimsuit, evening gown, and speech-based segments.

The competition includes several activities intended to highlight the contestants' "star quality", including travel assignments, photo shoots, and a fashion show. The preliminary competition takes place over two days: the first day features the swimsuit and evening gown segments, while the second day includes cocktail dress presentations and a "bare face" segment, introduced to emphasize natural beauty and confidence.

The results of the preliminary competition determine the Top 18 contestants, who are announced during the Grand Final. Following the announcement, all scores are reset, after which the Top 10, Top 5, and final Top 3 contestants are selected. The winner is then determined following the final question-and-answer segment.

=== Scoring system ===
Reverse-calculated K value
MaxVote	K value	Top vote recipient	Points earned	Round
26,524	99,000	Hương Giang	0.80	Top 3
26,822	100,000	Zewen Qin	0.80	Preliminary
32,660	100,000	Hương Giang	0.98	Top 18
36,695	100,000	Hương Giang	1.10	Top 10
64,410	299,000	Hương Giang	0.65	Top 5

Throughout the competition, the results of each round are determined through a weighted scoring system consisting of 70% judges’ evaluation and 30% public voting. The same scoring ratio is applied through the selection of the final Top 3 contestants.

According to the organizers, the public voting component is calculated using the "K-System", a benchmark-based proportional scoring method. Under the system, contestants first receive a normalized audience vote score on a 10-point scale based on a fixed benchmark (K value) of 100,000 votes per round. Contestants who meet or exceed the benchmark receive the maximum score, while those who do not reach the threshold receive scores proportionate to the level of support obtained.

The audience vote score is calculated using the following formula:

V = min (10, (V_{i}÷K) × 10)

where V_{i} represents the number of votes received by contestant i. Under this method, contestants receiving fewer than 100,000 votes are awarded scores proportionate to their vote total, while those reaching or exceeding the threshold receive the full 10 points.

The normalized score is subsequently converted into the public voting component, which accounts for 30% of the total score, using the following formula:

Total score = (J × 0.7) + (V × 0.3)

where J represents the average judges’ score and V represents the audience vote score.

The combined scoring formula may be expressed as follows:

Total score = (J × 0.7) + min ((V_{i} ÷ 10,000) × 0.3, 3)

Scores from both judges and public voting, together with the names of the judges, are displayed in real time during the competition as part of the event's transparency measures. The organizers described the format as a "fully open scoring system", distinguishing it from the private third-party tabulation services commonly used in beauty pageants to certify competition results.

=== Voting system disruptions and access concerns ===
The Grand Final on 30 May 2026 was interrupted twice by platform failures. The MGI voting site crashed due to the volume of simultaneous users, causing an approximately one-hour delay. MGI reverted to manual scoring during the affected swimsuit round. As an improvised workaround, MGI set up a physical payment booth near the stage inside MGI Hall, allowing on-site attendees to purchase votes directly by credit card, a measure that created a de facto two-tier system in which those present in Bangkok retained uninterrupted voting access while remote supporters remained locked out. Pageant executive Jonas Gaffud disclosed that his team stationed themselves near the booth throughout every round, spending approximately ₱100,000 per round — around half a million pesos on coronation night alone.

The disparity had measurable consequences on results. contestant Faith Maria Porter disclosed that her family and supporters repeatedly encountered technical problems while attempting to vote online throughout the event. She finished as 1st Runner-Up despite six of the eight judges awarding her a perfect score of 10 in the Top 3 round, yet she accumulated only 140 audience votes. Discussions surrounding the voting system also extended to Mariana Bečková’s placement, with some online commentators questioning whether technical disruptions may have influenced audience-supported outcomes. In the aftermath of the pageant, several contestants and beauty pageant observers reportedly raised concerns regarding the transparency and reliability of the voting system used during the final competition.

=== Selection committee ===
- Lupita Jones — Miss Universe 1991 from Mexico
- Natalie Glebova — Miss Universe 2005 from Canada
- Abena Akuaba — Miss Grand International 2020 from the United States
- Isabella Menin — Miss Grand International 2022 from Brazil
- Jojo Bragais — Filipino shoe designer and entrepreneur
- Omar Harfouch — French–Lebanese composer and businessman
- Osmel Sousa — Cuban–Venezuelan beauty pageant entrepreneur and former president of the Miss Venezuela Organization
- Psi Scott — Thai–Scottish marine conservationist

== Contestants ==
56 contestants are competing for the title.

- Qualified for the top 18

No.	Contestant	Country/ Territory	Age (Note: Ages at the time of the pageant)	Hometown	Previous International Competition (Note: The international competition through which the contestant met the eligibility requirement for MGI All Stars.)	Preliminary Score			Ref.
No.	Contestant	Country/ Territory	Age	Hometown	Previous International Competition	Judges	Vote	Total	Ref.
1	Alexandra Zanela	CAN	27	–	Winner — Miss Global Asian 2026	6.58	1	4.60	
2	Alexia Núñez	PHL	27	–	Winner — Noble Queen of the Universe 2025	7.38	9,132	5.44	
3	Angel Bhathal	CAN	39	Toronto	Contestant — Miss Galaxy International 2016; Contestant — Miss Global 2019; Winner — Dr. World 2021; Winner — Miss Cappadocia International 2022	7.15	44	5.01	
4	Azzaya Tsogt-Ochir	MNG	30	Ulaanbaatar	Contestant — Miss International 2015; Winner — Miss Asia 2018; Contestant — Miss Earth 2019	8.33	104	5.83	
5	Carry Xie	CHN	36	–	Winner — Miss United Nation International	6.61	280	4.63	
6	Chabeli Peña	DOM	28	–	4th Runner-up — Universal Woman 2024	7.75	70	5.43	
7	Danilka Germán	DOM	30	Elías Piña	Contestant — Miss Tourism Global City 2019; Contestant — Miss Tourism of the Globe 2019; Top 6 — Top Model of the World 2023	8.77	217	6.14	
8	Dela Deniya	IDN	30	–	Top 11 — The Miss Globe 2025	6.95	4,099	4.99	
9	Domiah Lihonde	ZMB	36	Chawama	Top 8 — Miss Heritage International 2014; Top 10 — Miss Cosmopolitan World 2016; Contestant — Miss Super Globe 2019; Contestant — Miss Planet International 2023	6.18	509	4.34	
10	Duygu Çakmak	TUR	36	–	Contestant — The Miss Globe 2020; 3rd Runner-up — Miss Europe 2021	6.53	69	4.57	
11	Elizabeth Cron	ROU	38	Allentown	Contestant — Miss Tourism Sri Lanka International 2016; Contestant — Mrs. Tourism Queen International 2018; Contestant — Miss Europe Continental 2025	6.95	111	4.87	
12	Faddya Halabi	ITA	38	–	Winner — Miss Tourism International 2014	8.65	503	6.07	
13	Faith Maria Porter	GHA	26	Bowie	3rd Runner-up — Miss Grand International 2025	9.70	1,507	6.84	
14	Fationa Ndokaj	ALB	20	–	2nd Runner-up — Miss Elite 2023	8.08	495	5.67	
15	Francia Cortés	MEX	27	Tepic	Top 5 — Miss Charm 2025	8.76	22,374	6.80	
16	Fuschia Ravena	PHL	30	Bogo	Winner — Miss International Queen 2022	8.31	21,641	6.47	
17	Gabriela de la Cruz	VEN	26	San Felipe	4th Runner-up — Miss Supranational 2019	9.28	1,050	6.52	
18	Gazini Ganados	PHL	30	Talisay	Top 20 — Miss Universe 2019	9.06	3,352	6.44	
19	Harriotte Lane	GBR	24	Newcastle	Contestant — Miss Teen Galaxy 2018; 4th Runner-up — Miss International 2019; Top 22 — Miss Grand International 2025	8.91	1,042	6.27	
20	Hương Giang Nguyễn	VNM	34	Hanoi	Winner — Miss International Queen 2018; Contestant — Miss Universe 2025	8.73	14,367	6.54	
21	Imelda Schweighart	PHL	31	Puerto Princesa	Contestant — Miss Earth 2016	7.94	73	5.56	
22	Isabella Santiago	VEN	35	–	Winner — Miss International Queen 2014	8.37	23,595	6.57	
23	Jana Marvanová	CZE	28	Ústí nad Labem	Contestant —Top Model of the World 2022; 5th Runner-up — Miss Europe Continental; Contestant — Miss Glamour Look International 2023; Contestant — Universal Woman 2025; Top 12 — Miss Global 2025; Top 20 — Miss Eco International 2025	6.94	149	4.86	
24	Kelly van den Dungen	NLD	32	Amsterdam	Top 20 — Miss Grand International 2017; Top 25 — Miss Supranational 2018	7.68	433	5.39	
25	Keylyn Trajano	PHL	30	Porac	Top 13 — Universal Woman 2025	8.21	18	5.75	
26	Kodchakorn Korntrakoon	THA	25	Phuket	Top 21 — Miss Eco International 2024	8.26	613	5.80	
27	Lattana Munvilay	LAO	32	Salavan	Contestant — Miss Universe 2025	8.04	218	5.64	
28	Lilia Gzraryan	ARM	23	Yerevan	Contestant — Miss Cosmo 2024; Contestant — Miss Grand International 2025	8.90	2,702	6.31	
29	Makeeba Kaaya Animpong	GHA	25	Accra	4th Runner-up — Miss Aura International 2024	8.73	186	6.12	
30	Mariana Bečková	CZE	27	Prague	4th Runner-up — Miss Grand International 2022	9.48	512	6.65	
31	Marie Diamala	CIV	23	Aboisso	Contestant — Miss Universe 2024	6.97	2,756	4.96	
32	Mejreme Hajdaraj	KSV	25	–	Contestant — The Miss Globe 2022; Winner — Miss Elite 2023	7.54	337	5.29	
33	Melenia Villalta	CRI	23	–	Top 15 — Teen Universe International 2022	6.79	0	4.75	
34	Mika	CHN	28	Beijing	Top 11 — Miss International Queen 2023	6.75	480	4.74	
35	Milanda Aengmany	LAO	29	–	Contestant — Miss International Queen 2022	5.87	12	4.11	
36	Nicole Puello	DOM	26	Santo Domingo	2nd Runner-up — Miss New Models Universal 2016	8.96	5,691	6.44	
37	Pearl Zhou	CHN	30	–	Winner — Miss World International 2025	7.82	0	5.47	
38	Priscilla Londoño	COL	32	–	5th Runner-up — Miss Grand International 2022	9.36	767	6.58	
39	Qatrisha Zairyah	SGP	34	Singapore	Contestant — Miss Equality World 2022; Contestant — Miss Trans Star International 2023; 1st Runner-up — Miss International Queen 2023; Winner — K-Seoul Model International 2025	7.88	1,542	5.56	
40	Samantha Quenedit	ECU	25	Pichincha	Top 16 — Miss Teen Universe 2017; Top 22 — Miss Grand International 2025	9.03	3,373	6.42	
41	Sanjana Sekharmantri	IND	23	Hyderabad	Contestant — Miss Wellness World 2025	6.87	121	4.81	
42	Sanskriti Bhatta	NPL	24	Dhangadhi	Contestant — Miss Eco International 2025	7.02	7	4.91	
43	Selene Bublitz	ARG	27	Corrientes	2nd Runner-up — Miss America Latina del Mundo 2022; Contestant — Miss Earth 2023	8.28	527	5.81	
44	Siqi Jiang	CHN	26	Liaoning	Top 40 — Miss World 2021	7.31	0	5.12	
45	Sonia Xu	CHN	28	–	Contestant — Miss Scuba International 2025	7.01	0	4.91	
46	Suheyn Cipriani	PER	29	Lima	Winner — Miss Eco International 2019	9.15	13,462	6.81	
47	Sukie Cheema	USA	26	–	Top 5 — Queen of the World International 2024; Top 10 — Miss Planet International 2025	8.24	82	5.77	
48	Tharina Botes	THA	29	Phuket	Contestant — Miss International 2016; Top 36 — Miss Model of the World 2018; Contestant — Miss World 2023	9.03	3,400	6.42	
49	Thet San Andersen	MMR	28	Yangon	Contestant — Miss Universe 2024	8.27	2,050	5.85	
50	Tishani Perera	LKA	21	Colombo	Contestant — Miss Grand International 2025	6.88	0	4.82	
51	Vanessa Pulgarín	COL	34	Medellín	Contestant — Miss International 2017; Top 12 — Miss Universe 2025	9.74	1,371	6.86	
52	Yada Theppanom	THA	34	Prachuap Khiri Khan	Top 20 — Miss Grand International 2013; Winner — Miss Southeast Asia Tourism Ambassadress 2015	7.81	117	5.47	
53	Yamilex Hernández	DOM	30	La Vega	Top 15 — Miss International 2023; Top 30 — Miss Universe 2025	9.23	550	6.48	
54	Yining Wang	HKG	29	Hong Kong	Winner — Miss Ethnic Chinese International Pageant Hong Kong 2025	6.98	0	4.88	
55	Yuka Oyama	JPN	28	–	Contestant — Miss Aura International 2021; Contestant — Miss Tourism International 2022	7.31	260	5.13	
56	Zewen Qin	CHN	29	–	Contestant — Miss Global 2025	8.02	26,822	6.42	

== See also ==
- MGI All Stars
- Miss Grand International
- Beauty pageant
