= Amara Bo =

Burmese model and beauty pageant titleholder (born 1999)

- အမရာဘို
- Born: 24 December 1999 (age 26); Mandalay, Myanmar
- Occupation: Model
- Height: 5 ft 11 in (1.80 m)
- Beauty pageant titleholder
- Title: Miss Universe Myanmar 2023
- Hair color: Black
- Eye color: Brown
- Major competitions: Miss Universe Myanmar 2019 (1st Runners-Up); Miss Universe Myanmar 2022 (Top 10 Finalist); Miss Universe Myanmar 2023 (Winner); Miss Universe 2023 (Unplaced)

Amara Bo (Burmese: အမရာဘို; born 24 December 1999) is a model and beauty queen from Myanmar. She won the title of Miss Universe Myanmar 2023 and represented Myanmar at the Miss Universe 2023 pageant held in San Salvador, El Salvador.

== Early life and education ==
Amara Bo was born in Mandalay. She has a bachelor's degree in computer science. She studied at the University of Computer Studies, Mandalay.

In 2019, Amara Bo participated in the Myanmar modeling competition, The Model Academy season 3 and entered the Top 5.

== Pageantry ==
=== Miss World Myanmar 2019 ===
Amara Bo began her beauty pageant career in 2019, when she participated in the Miss World Myanmar 2019 pageant at the Myanmar Convention Centre in Yangon, where she placed 1st runner-up and lost to eventual winner Khit Lin Latt Yoon.

=== Miss Universe Myanmar 2022 ===
On 1 October 2022, Amara Bo represented Mandalay at Miss Universe Myanmar 2022 and competed against 14 other finalists at the Grand Ballroom of Novotel Hotel in Yangon, where she placed in the Top 10 and Zar Li Moe is the new Miss Universe Myanmar 2022.

=== Miss Universe Myanmar 2023 ===
On September 14, 2023, Bo represented Keng Tung at Miss Universe Myanmar 2023 and competed against 31 other candidates at the Novotel Max Yangon Hotel in Yangon, where she won the title and was succeeded by Zar Li Moe.

=== Miss Universe 2023 ===
On November 18, 2023, she represented Myanmar at Miss Universe 2023 in San Salvador, El Salvador.

Awards and achievements
Preceded by Zar Li Moe	Miss Universe Myanmar; 2023	Succeeded by Thet San Andersen
