= Myo Ko Ko San =

- မျိုးကိုကိုစန်း
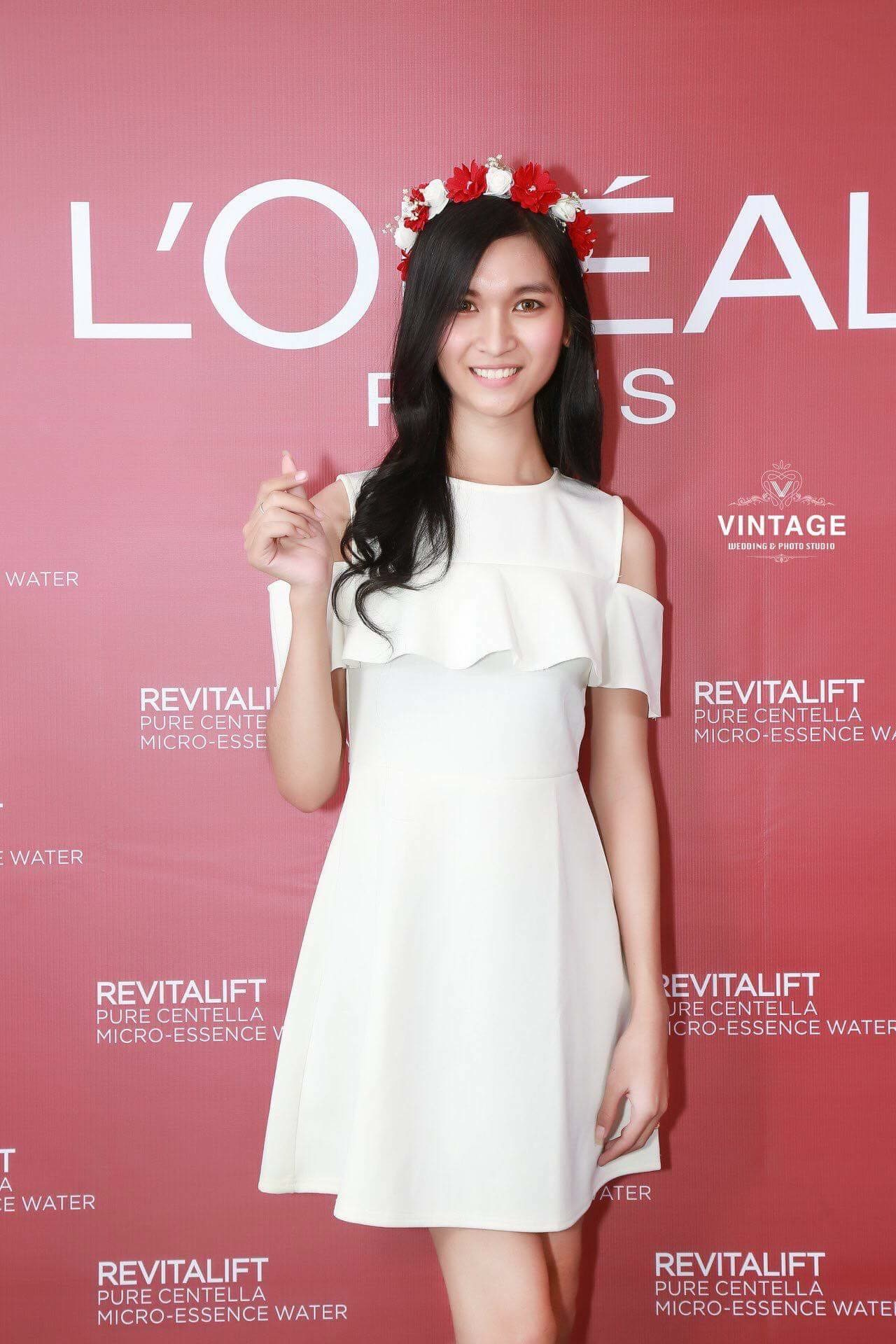
- Myo Ko Ko San at L'Oréal Event Myanmar
- Born: Myo Ko Ko San; September 1, 1994 (age 32); Mandalay, Myanmar
- Education: Technological University, Mandalay
- Occupations: Model, LGBT advocate, Beauty queen
- Height: 1.73 m (5 ft 8 in)
- Beauty pageant titleholder
- Title: Miss Rainbow Ribbon 2013; Miss International Queen Myanmar 2014
- Years active: 2013–present
- Hair color: Dark Brown
- Eye colour: Black
- Major competitions: Miss Rainbow Ribbon 2013 (Winner); Miss International Queen 2014 (Unplaced); Miss Universe Myanmar 2022 (Top 10); Miss Universe Myanmar 2025 (4th Runner-up)

Myo Ko Ko San (Burmese: မျိုးကိုကိုစန်း; born 1 September 1994) is a Burmese transgender model, and beauty pageant titleholder who was elected Miss International Queen Myanmar 2014 and represented Myanmar at the Miss International Queen 2014.

== Early life and education ==
Myo Ko Ko San was born on 1 September 1994 in Mandalay, Myanmar, as a boy. She is the second child among three siblings, having a younger brother and an older brother. She experienced gender dysphoria beginning in early childhood, and began her gender transition at the age of 15 while attending school. She studied civil engineering at Technological University, Mandalay. She underwent sex reassignment surgery in Thailand in 2017, sponsored by Kamol Cosmetic & Plastic Surgery.

== Career ==
In 2013, she participated in Miss Rainbow Ribbon 2013, a pageant for transgender women held on October 23, 2013, at the Hotel Mandalay by Rainbow Ribbon Network Myanmar. Following her victory, she was chosen to represent Myanmar in Miss International Queen 2014, the world's largest beauty pageant for transgender women.

She represented Myanmar at the Miss International Queen 2014 pageant, held on November 7, 2014, in Pattaya, Thailand, competing against participants from 20 other nations. She achieved the 1st runner-up position for Talent.

After participating in the Miss International Queen 2014 pageant, she gained recognition as Miss International Queen Myanmar and went on to pursue a career as a transgender model.

She is set to appear in an untitled film portraying a transgender person who stands up for her rights, even to the point of death. However, in 2016, she declined the offer because the production intended to replace her male voice.

On 19 June 2018, she received the ASEAN-LGBT Community Pride Awards 2018.

Myo Ko Ko San competed in Miss Universe Myanmar 2022 and made history as the first transgender woman to participate in the Miss Universe Myanmar Pageant. She achieved a top 10 placement.

In 2025, She completed Miss Universe Myanmar 2025 for second time, representing Mogok city. At the end of the event, she was announced 4th runner-up behind the eventual winner, Myat Yadanar Soe of Pyin Oo Lwin. She was the first transgender contestant to place at Top 6 after the Miss Universe Myanmar Organization changed the rules to allow trans women to compete.

== Lawsuit ==
Myo Ko Ko San was sued under section 66 (d) of the telecommunications law by actress Wutt Hmone Shwe Yi, who filed a lawsuit against Myo for defamation, accusing Myo of being the administrator of Cele Cele Small, a Facebook page which posted allegedly defamatory material towards the actress. Cele Cele Small was a Facebook page with over 1 million likes that reveals inside information on the private lives of Myanmar's celebrities and artists. Police took the model into custody at Yangon International Airport on her return from a visit to Bangkok, Thailand, and she was held at the Yankin Township Police Station on 17 January 2017.

=== Aftermath ===
In Yankin Township Court, Myo Ko Ko San denied involvement with the Facebook gossip page and questioned why the police had the right to arrest her without strong evidence. After four days in jail, Myo Ko Ko San was released and the defamation case against her was declared spurious as investigating officers found insufficient evidence to support the lawsuit.

After being released, she conducted a press conference, emphasizing the necessity for Wutt Hmone Shwe Yi to publicly apologize to her for the false accusations.

== LGBT activism ==
Myo Ko Ko San is an icon within Myanmar's LGBT community and an advocate for LGBT rights in Myanmar. Engaging in numerous campaigns for LGBT rights activism, Myo aspires to contribute to educating people about LGBT issues and fostering a deeper understanding in society.
