= Phùng Trương Trân Đài =

Vietnamese beauty pageant titleholder

- Born: Ho Chi Minh City, Vietnam
- Education: Asian America Beauty College
- Height: 1.71 m (5 ft 7 in)
- Beauty pageant titleholder
- Title: Miss International Queen Vietnam 2020
- Major competitions: Miss International Queen Vietnam 2020; (Winner); Miss International Queen 2022; (Top 6)

Phùng Trương Trân Đài is a Vietnamese beauty pageant titleholder. She won Miss International Queen Vietnam 2020 and represented Vietnam at Miss International Queen 2022 in Thailand.

== Career ==
Since 2009, Đài has participated in fashion and magazine photoshoots with actors and models.

In 2015, Đài went to the US to live and study. She graduated from Asian-American International Beauty College with a degree in skin care. During this time, she also participated in fashion shows in Vietnam and events for the Vietnamese community.

== Pageantry ==
In 2020, Đài entered and won Miss International Queen Vietnam 2020. This is also the first time Đài revealed that she is transgender. She will represent Vietnam at Miss International Queen 2021.

Awards and achievements
Preceded by Bùi Đình Hoài Sa	Miss International Queen Vietnam; 2022	Succeeded by Nguyễn Hà Dịu Thảo
Preceded by Đỗ Nhật Hà	Hoa hậu Chuyển giới Việt Nam; 2022	Succeeded by Nguyễn Hà Dịu Thảo
Preceded by (France) Louiz Avendei	Best Talent; Miss International Queen; 2022	Succeeded by (Thailand) Arissara Kankla
