= Eaint Myat Chal =

Burmese model and beauty queen

- Born: 28 April 1993 (age 33); Chaungzon, Myanmar
- Education: Dagon University
- Beauty pageant titleholder
- Title: Miss Earth Myanmar 2015; Miss South East Asian Myanmar 2014
- Hair color: Black
- Eye color: Brown
- Major competitions: Miss Earth 2015 (Unplaced); Miss Earth Myanmar 2015 (Winner); Miss Earth Myanmar 2014 (First Runner Up); Miss Supranational Myanmar 2019 (Winner); Miss Supranational 2019 (unplaced); Miss Universe Myanmar 2024 (3rd runner up)

Eaint Myat Chal (Burmese: အိမ့်မျက်ခြယ်; also spelt Eaint Myet Chal or Eaint Myat Chel) is a Burmese model and beauty pageant titleholder, who was crowned Miss Earth Myanmar 2015 and represented Myanmar at Miss Earth 2015.

== Biography ==
Eaint was born on 28 April 1993 in Chaungzon, Myanmar. She has two brothers and one of them has down syndrome and heart disease resulting him to be unable to walk. She and her mother sell rice cakes to support her family's everyday needs.

Eaint finished college at Dagon University with a degree in English. After graduating college, Eint Myet Che worked as an accountant before being a model for a well known talent agency in Yangon.

Eint Myet Che also dreams of becoming an actress in Myanmar. She had a chance to get a training at Myanmar Motion Picture Organization in 2013.

== Pageantry ==
=== Miss Golden Land Myanmar 2014 ===
She joined the second edition of Miss Golden Land Myanmar. At the end of the event, she was proclaimed as first runner up. The pageant was won by Ei Mon Khine who represented Myanmar at Miss Earth 2014.

By being first runner up, she attained the title of Miss South East Asian Myanmar 2014. She represented her country in Bangkok and was given the Miss Photogenic award.

=== Miss Golden Land Myanmar 2015 ===
Eaint Myat Chal once again joined the said beauty pageant the same year. But this time, she was proclaimed as the main winner as Miss Earth Myanmar 2015. The other winners are L Bawk Nue as Miss Supranational Myanmar 2015, W May Shinn Sein was crowned Miss Intercontinental Myanmar 2015, Nang Seng Ing was crowned Miss Tourism Myanmar 2015 and Kyu Kyu was crowned Miss Face of Beauty Myanmar 2015. The finale of Miss Golden Land Myanmar 2015 was graced by Miss Supranational 2014, Asha Bhat from India, who was present as one of the judges at the event.

The Miss Earth 2014 winner, Jamie Herrell, was supposed to travel to Myanmar as well to grace the pageant and take part in the environmental activities. However, Jamie was not able to travel because of health reasons. She was crowned by the outgoing Miss Earth Myanmar 2014 winner, Ei Mon Khine.

=== Miss Earth 2015 ===
By winning the Miss Earth Myanmar title, she is Myanmar's representative to be Miss Earth 2015 and would try to succeed Jamie Herrell as the next Miss Earth.

Awards and achievements
Preceded by Ei Mon Khine	Miss Earth Myanmar; 2015	Succeeded by Nan Khine Shwe Warwin
Preceded by Shwe Eain Si	Miss Supranational Myanmar; 2019	Succeeded by
