= Theint Zar Chi =

Burmese model

- Born: Theint Zar Chi Nyut; 1998 (age 27–28); Taunggyi, Myanmar
- Education: Bachelor of engineering ( Mechanical )
- Height: 168 cm (5 ft 6 in)
- Beauty pageant titleholder
- Title: Miss Universe Mandalay Region 2016 (2nd runner up); Miss International Myanmar 2017 (Top 10); Miss Mandalay Region 2018 (Winner); Miss Golden Land Myanmar 2018 (4th Runner-up); Miss Earth Myanmar 2020 (Top 10)
- Hair color: Dark Brown
- Eye color: Dark Brown

Theint Zar Chi is a Burmese model and beauty pageant titleholder who was crowned as Miss Earth Myanmar 2021.

She is currently crowned Miss Earth Myanmar 2021. She will be represented at Miss Earth 2021 in December 2021.

== Pageantry ==
=== Miss Universe Myanmar (Mandalay Region)2016 ===
Theint competed in the Miss Universe Mandalay 2016 pageant which was held at the Mandalay City Hall, last 2016 Aug 17, she was placed in the 2nd runner up.

=== Miss International Myanmar 2017 ===
After competing in the Miss Universe Mandalay 2016, she joined in the Miss International Myanmar 2017. At the end of event, she was placed in Top 10.The pageant was won by Sao Yoon Wadi Oo

=== Miss Golden Land Myanmar 2018 ===
Theint also competed in the Miss Golden Land Myanmar 2018 pageant which was held on the Grand Ballroom of Taw Win Garden Hotel, in Yangon on 14 August 2018. At the end of the event, Shwe Eain Si was crowned Miss Supranational Myanmar 2018. But, she was placed in Top 4.

=== Miss Earth Myanmar 2020 ===
She joined Miss Earth Myanmar 2020 which was held August 31, 2020. At the end of the event, she placed in top finalist.

- Special Awards:
  - (bronze) Topic Interview
  - (gold) Resort Wear Competition

Awards and achievements
| Preceded by Amara Shune Lei | Miss Earth Myanmar; 2021 | Succeeded by Incumbent |
