= Miss Universe Myanmar 2022 =

2022 beauty pageant in Myanmar

- Date: 1 October 2022.
- Presenters: Aye Chan Moe
- Entertainment: Min Ya Tu Paing
- Venue: Grand Ballroom, Novotel Hotel, Yangon
- Broadcaster: Fortune TV
- Entrants: 14
- Placements: 10
- Withdrawals: 03 - Han Bao Bao; 10 - Ni Ni Lin Eain
- Winner: Zar Li Moe (Kachin State) Bhamo

Miss Universe Myanmar 2022 was the 9th Miss Universe Myanmar pageant held on October 1, 2022 at the Grand Ballroom, Novotel Hotel, Yangon. Zar Li Moe of Bhamo won the competition, but didn't have a chance of being crowned by the reigning Miss Universe Myanmar, Thuzar Wint Lwin. She represented Myanmar at Miss Universe 2022 in New Orleans Morial Convention Center in New Orleans, Louisiana in the United States but unplaced.

== Results ==
=== Placements ===
Placement	Contestant	International pageant	International Results
Miss Universe Myanmar 2022	Bhamo – Zar Li Moe	Miss Universe 2022	Unplaced
1st runner-up	Yangon – Ya Mone (Resigned)		
2nd runner-up	Shwebo – Thinzar Min Htet		
3rd runner-up	Yangon – Kendra Kaing Zar Thant	Face Of Beauty International 2023 Miss International Myanmar 2024	Winner
4th runner-up	Yangon – Kay Zin Khant		
Top 10	Mandalay – Amara Bo; Yangon – May Htet Khine; Mandalay – Myo Ko Ko San §; Yangon – Sasha Viola; Sittwe – Soe Htet Nwe		

§ - Voted into the Top 10 by viewers.

=== Special awards ===
Award	Contestant
Miss Royal by Lucky Diamond	(Kachin State) Bhamo – Zar Li Moe
Miss Heathy Skin	(Yangon Region) Yangon – Kendra
Miss Beautiful Smile	(Kachin State) Bhamo – Zar Li Moe
Best Face of Pan Aesthetics	(Kachin State) Bhamo – Zar Li Moe

== Pageant ==
=== Selection committee ===
- Min That San – Fashion Designer (Sweet & Smart)
- Lin Lin – Actress & Make-up Artist
- Sharr Htut Eaindra – Miss Universe Myanmar 2014
- Htet Htet Htun – Miss Universe Myanmar 2016
- U Win Than – Chairman of Lucky Diamonds Myanmar
- Dr. Laurel – CEO & Founder of Pan Aesthetics Clinic
- Dr. Hsu Yee Aung Soe – Founder of Aesthetics Dentist - DSC Dental Specialist Clinic
- Zun Than Sin – Miss Universe Myanmar 2017
- Swe Zin Htet – Miss Universe Myanmar 2019

== Contestants ==
Fourteen contestants competed for the title.

- The contestant won an international pageant.
- The contestant was withdraw before the final.

No.	Candidates	Age (Note: Ages at the time of the pageant)	Height	Hometown	Placement	Note
01	Amara Bo	25	5 ft 11 1/2 in (181.6 cm)	Mandalay	Top 10	Later Crowned Miss Universe Myanmar 2023
02	Aye Myat Thwe			Yangon		
04	Hsu Labb Thaddar	22	5 ft 4 in (163 cm)	Yangon		Previously Miss Crystal Angel Myanmar 2019
05	Kay Zin Khant	18		Yangon	4th Runner-up	
06	Kendra	18	5 ft 7 in (170 cm)	Yangon	3rd Runner-up	Later Crowned Face Of Beauty International 2023
07	Khin Lamin Thar			Yangon		
08	May Htet Khine			Yangon	Top 10	
09	Myo Ko Ko San	27	5 ft 8 in (173 cm)	Mandalay	Top 10	First openly transgender woman to compete at Miss Universe Myanmar. Previously competed in Miss International Queen 2014, but was unplaced.
10	Ni Ni Lin Eain	23	5 ft 6.5 in (168.9 cm)}	Mudon	DNC	Later, crowned as Miss Grand Myanmar 2023
11	Phoo Pwint Sone	23	5 ft 4 in (163 cm)	Paung		
12	Sasha Viola	23	5 ft 5 1/2 in (166.4 cm)	Yangon	Top 10	Previously Miss Golden Land Yangon (North) 2019
13	Soe Htet Nwe	24	5 ft 5 in (165 cm)	Sittwe	Top 10	Previously Miss Burma Sittwe 2021; Later winner of Miss TMT Tachileik 2023
14	Thinzar Min Htet			Shwebo	2nd Runner-up	
15	Ya Mone			Yangon	1st Runner-up (Resigned)	Later resigned her title for education and personal matters. Previously 2nd Runner-up in both Miss Myanmar International 2019 and Miss Myanmar World 2018.
16	Zar Li Moe	20	5 ft 10 1/2 in (179.1 cm)	Bhamo	Miss Universe Myanmar 2022	Previously Miss Tourism and Culture Universe Bhamo 2020

=== Withdrawals ===
- 03 - Han Bo Bo withdrew due to political reasons
- 10 - Ni Ni Lin Eain withdrew due to her mother's unstable health.

=== Crossovers and returnees ===
Contestants who competed in editions of Miss Universe Myanmar and other local and international beauty pageants with their respective placements:

==== City pageants ====
Miss Burma Sittwe

- 2021: Soe Htet Nwe (Winner)

Miss Universe Mawlamyine

- 2020: Phoo Pwint Sone (3rd runner-up)

Miss Tourism and Culture Universe Bhamo

- 2020: Zar Li Moe (Winner)

Miss Golden Land Yangon Region

- 2019: Sasha Viola (Winner - North Yangon)

Miss Teen Universe Hpa-An

- 2018: Phoo Pwint Sone (Winner)

==== National Pageants ====
Miss Crystal Angel Myanmar

- 2019: Hsu Labb Thaddar (Winner)

Miss International Myanmar

- 2019: Ya Mone (2nd Runner-up)

Miss World Myanmar

- 2019: Amara (1st Runner-up)
- 2018: Ya Mone (2nd Runner-up)

Miss Rainbow Ribbon

- 2013: Myo Ko Ko San (Winner)

==== International Pageants ====
Miss Grand International

- 2023: Ni Ni Lin Eain (1st Runner-up)

Miss International Queen

- 2014: Myo Ko Ko San (Unplaced)
