= Fuschia Anne Ravena =

Filipina actress and model (born 1995)

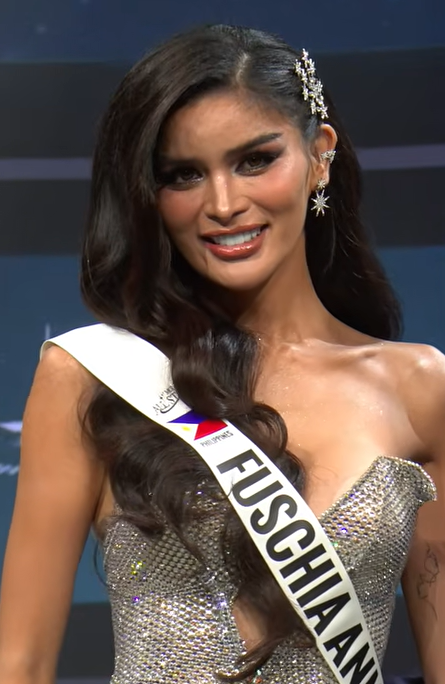
- Ravena in 2026
- Born: June 12, 1995 (age 31); Bogo, Cebu, Philippines
- Beauty pageant titleholder
- Title: Miss International Queen Philippines 2022; Miss International Queen 2022
- Hair color: Black
- Eye colour: Brown
- Major competitions: Miss International Queen Philippines 2022; (Winner); Miss International Queen 2022; (Winner); MGI All Stars 1st Edition; (Top 18)

Fuschia Anne Ravena (born January 12, 1995) is a Filipino businesswoman and beauty queen titleholder who won the Miss International Queen 2022 title.

== Early life ==
Fuschia Anne Ravena was born on June 12, 1995, in Bogo, Cebu, and was the youngest among seven siblings. Assigned male at birth, Ravena grew up in a farm where she developed her stance in animal rights advocacy.

== Pageantry ==
Ravena began joining barangay-level beauty pageants at age 13. She joined Queen of Cebu in 2013 but was left unplaced. She also joined Super Sireyna of Eat Bulaga! and Miss Gay Mandaue.

Ravena won the Miss International Queen 2022 pageant contest. She won the title of Miss International Queen Philippines 2022, and was later named as Miss International Queen 2022 winner, on June 25, 2022.

After Trixie Maristela in 2015 and Kevin Balot in 2012, Ravena was the third Filipino to win the Miss International Queen 2022 title. She was among 23 contestants participating in the pageant, with Colombia's Jasmine Jimenez and France's Aëla Chanel finishing second and third, respectively.

Ravena represented the Philippines at the first edition of the Miss Grand International All-Stars in 2026 and placed in the Top 18.

== Personal life ==
Ravena is a transgender woman and states that her family has been supportive of her gender identity. As of 2022, Ravena lives in Cebu City.

Ravena's gender transition started after she joined Queen of Cebu in 2013 after being inspired by her best friend's femininity. However Ravena reportedly had challenge in getting access to hormone replacement therapy which she was later able to fund through her own poultry business. In July 2023, Ravena underwent a sex reassignment surgery in Bangkok, Thailand.

== Filmography ==
Television

Year	Title	Notes
2018	Eat Bulaga!	Contestant (Segment: Super Sireyna!)

== See also ==
- Miss International Queen

Awards and achievements
Preceded by (Mexico) Valentina Fluchaire	Miss International Queen; 2022	Succeeded by (Netherlands) Solange Dekker
Preceded by Jess Labares	Miss International Queen Philippines; 2022	Succeeded by Lars Pacheco
