= Miss International Queen 2022 =

16th Miss International Queen pageant

- Date: 25 June 2022
- Presenters: Akanwit Wichiencharoen; Saraichatt Jirapatt
- Theme: Pride Together
- Venue: Tiffany's Show Pattaya, Pattaya, Chonburi, Thailand
- Broadcaster: Channel 3 (Thailand)
- Entrants: 23
- Placements: 11
- Debuts: Paraguay
- Withdrawals: Australia; China; Mongolia; Myanmar; Norway; Singapore; Sweden
- Returns: Cambodia; Canada; Colombia; Ecuador; Honduras; Korea; Puerto Rico; Venezuela
- Winner: Fuschia Anne Ravena; Philippines
- Congeniality: Minladar Engman; Laos
- Best National Costume: Yushin; Japan
- Photogenic: Sai Fhon; Cambodia

Miss International Queen 2022 was the 16th Miss International Queen pageant, held at the Tiffany's Show Pattaya in Pattaya, Chonburi, Thailand, on June 25, 2022.

Valentina Fluchaire of Mexico crowned Fuschia Anne Ravena of the Philippines as her successor at the end of the event. This is the third time that the Philippines claimed the title.

== Results ==
=== Placements ===
Placement	Contestant
Miss International Queen 2022	Philippines – Fuschia Anne Ravena
1st Runner-Up	Colombia – Jassmine Jímenez
2nd Runner-Up	France – Aëla Chanel
Top 6	Thailand – Kwanlada Rungrojampa; Venezuela – Sofia Salomón; Vietnam – Phùng Trương Trân Đài
Top 11	Cambodia – Sai Fhon; India – Namitha Marimuthu §; Mexico – Alejandra Morales; Peru – Javiera Arnillas; South Korea – Jin

§ – Voted into the Top 11 by viewers.

== Special awards ==
Award	Contestant
Best National Costume	Philippines - Fuschia Anne Ravena
Miss Congeniality	Philippines - Fuschia Anne Ravena
Miss Photogenic	Cambodia - Sai Fhon
Miss Popular Vote	India – Namitha Marimuthu
Best in Evening Gown	Thailand - Kwanlada Rungrojampa
Best in Talent	Vietnam – Phùng Trương Trân Đài

=== Best in Talent ===
Award	Contestant
Winner	Vietnam – Phùng Trương Trân Đài
1st Runner-Up	Thailand – Kwanlada Rungrojampa
2nd Runner-Up	Paraguay – Fabu Olmedo

== Contestants ==
23 contestants competed for the title.

Country/Territory	Delegate	Age (Note: Ages at the time of the pageant)	Hometown	Occupation
Brazil	Eloá Rodrigues	29	Rio de Janeiro	Dancer
Cambodia	Sai Fhon	24	Phnom Penh	Business owner, model, and actress
Canada	Patricia Jane Bustillo	34	Toronto	Hairstylist
Colombia	Jassmine Jimenez	25	Cali	Make-up artist and model
Ecuador	Mirka Alejandra Borja	29	Santo Domingo	Image consultant, model, and farmer
France	Aëla Chanel	33	Paris	Sales Associate
Honduras	Luciana Romero	26	Los Angeles	Make-up artist
India	Namitha Marimuthu	32	Chennai	Actress and model
Indonesia	Kazzia Doll	23	Makassar	Influencer
Japan	Yushin	33	Tokyo	Cosmetic producer and entertainer
Laos	Minladar Engmany	26	Vientiane	Business owner and student
Malaysia	Papai Cici	30	Sabah	Performer and model
Mexico	Alejandra Morales	27	Veracruz	Fitness trainer and model
Paraguay	Fabu Olmedo	28	Asunción	Singer, actress, and journalist
Peru	Javiera Arnillas	27	Lima	Actress and model
Philippines	Fuschia Anne Ravena	27	Bogo	Livestock and business owner
Puerto Rico	Catalina La Bella	33	San Juan	Performer
South Korea	Jin	20	Itaewon	Lush staff and model
Taiwan ROC	Allie Liao	30	Taipei	YouTuber, author and model
Thailand	Kwanlada Rungrojampa	24	Nakhon Pathom	YouTuber and model
United States	Catalina Cabella	30	South Carolina	Performer and model
Venezuela	Sofia Salomón	24	Ciudad Bolívar	Designer and model
Vietnam	Phùng Trương Trân Đài	30	Ho Chi Minh City	YouTuber and model

== Notes ==
=== Debuts ===
- Paraguay competed in Miss International Queen for the first time.

=== Returning countries ===
- Puerto Rico last competed in 2009.
- Cambodia last competed in 2016.
- Colombia and Honduras last competed in 2018.
- Canada, Ecuador, Korea and Venezuela last competed in 2019.

=== Withdrawals ===
- Australia, China, Norway, Singapore, and Sweden withdrew for unspecified reasons.

=== Other notes ===
- Moe Moe Lay of Myanmar dropped out from the contest.
- Sasha Montez of Cabo Verde and Shyraa Roy of Pakistan were expected to debut in Miss International Queen 2022 but did not compete due to lack of sponsorship.
