= Chaungzon =

Chaungzon ဍုၚ်ၜါသွာၚ် ချောင်းဆုံမြို့
- Town
- Location in Burma
- Coordinates: 16°23′N 97°32′E
- Country: Myanmar
- Division: Mon State

Population (2005)
  - Religions: Buddhism
- Time zone: UTC+6.30 (MST)

Chaungzon (Burmese: ချောင်းဆုံမြို့; Mon: ၜါသွာၚ်) is a town on Bilu Island (Belu-kyun) in the Mon State of south-east Myanmar.
