= East Yangon District =

Former district of Myanmar

Coordinates: 16°52′15″N 96°14′45″E

East Yangon District is a district of the Yangon Region in Myanmar.

location in Yangon region

== Townships ==
- Botataung
- Dagon Seikkan
- Dawbon
- East Dagon
- Mingala Taungnyunt
- North Dagon
- North Okkalapa
- Pazundaung
- South Dagon
- South Okkalapa
- Tamwe
- Thaketa
- Thingangyun
- Yankin
