= South Yangon District =

District of Myanmar

Coordinates: 16°44′N 96°30′E

South Yangon District was a former district of the Yangon Region in Myanmar. In was split into the Twante District and Thanlyin District in 2022.

location in Yangon region (Cocokyun township is not include)

== Townships ==
=== Western townships ===
The following townships later formed the Twante District in 2022.

- Dala
- Kawhmu
- Kungyangon
- Seikkyi Kanaungto
- Twante

=== Eastern townships ===
The following townships later formed the Thanlyin District in 2022.

- Cocokyun
- Khayan
- Kyauktan
- Thanlyin
- Thongwa
