= North Yangon District =

Coordinates: 17.26°N 96.03°E

North Yangon District is a district of the Yangon Region in Myanmar.

location in Yangon region

== Townships ==
- East Hlaingthaya
- Hlegu
- Hmawbi
- Htantabin
- Insein
- Mingaladon
- Shwepyitha
- Taikkyi
- West Hlaingthaya

Hlaingthaya was split into East and West in 2020.
