= Miss Grand Myanmar 2025 =

3rd edition of the Miss Grand Myanmar beauty pageant

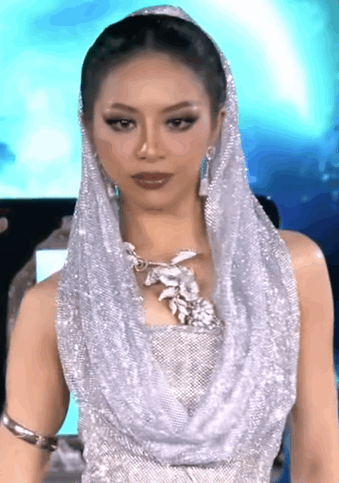
- JK Sophia
- Date: June 21, 2025
- Entertainment: Awng Ni
- Venue: Shwe Htut Tin Complex, Tamwe, Yangon
- Broadcaster: Sky Net; YouTube
- Entrants: 27
- Placements: 16
- Debuts: Dawei; Kawthaung; Kyaukse; Lashio; Magway; Mandalay; Mu Se; Namhkam; Naypyidaw; Tachileik; Taunggyi; Yangon North; Yangon South
- Withdrawals: Daik-U; Kanpetlet; Kengtung; Minbu; Monywa; Mogok; Myawaddy; Myingyan; Paletwa; Pakokku; Pyin Oo Lwin; Pyu; Taungdwingyi; Tedim; Thanbyuzayat; Thandaunggyi; Waw
- Winner: Jawkang Sophia Nawaug (Namhkam)
- Congeniality: Htoo Htar Ni (Bago)
- Best National Costume: Hkawng Tsai (Wine Maw)
- Photogenic: Hkawng Tsai (Wine Maw)

External videos
- Grand final round

Miss Grand Myanmar 2025 was the third edition of the Miss Grand Myanmar pageant, held at the Shwe Htut Tin Complex in Tamwe, Yangon, on June 21, 2025. Contestants from 27 cities of the country competed for the title.

The contest was won by a 21-year-old Jawkang Sophia Nawaug, representing Namhkam. JK Sophia represented Myanmar at the international stage, Miss Grand International 2025, which held in Thailand on 18 October 2025.

The event was also attended by Miss Grand International 2024 CJ Opiaza of the Philippines and Miss Grand International's vice president Teresa Chaivisut.

== Background ==
=== Date and venue ===
After obtaining the license, M Entertainment led by Maran Seng Naw, began franchising the competition license to local organizers who would name their city representative for the national contest, and later announced on the official Facebook account on 22 March 2025 that the national grand final was set for 21 June 2025 in Yangon.

The following is a list of the main events of this year's contest.

- 8 June: Swimsuit competition
- 10 June: Runway challenge
- 12 June: Talent competition
- 16 June: National costume competition
- 19 June: Preliminary competition
- 21 June: Grand final round

=== Selection of contestants ===
Six regional pageants were held for this year's edition; however, qualified contestants from three regional stages, including Yangon, Tachileik, and Mawlamyine, were disqualified from the national contest due to a change of national licensee.

List of Miss Grand Myanmar 2025 preliminary pageants, by the coronation date
Pageant	Edition	Date & venue	Entrants	Main winner	Number of qualifiers	Ref.
Miss Grand Yangon	2nd	April 3, 2024, at the Sedona Hotel, Yangon	12	~~Eaint Hmuu Kay Twel~~	~~8~~ (Note: Yangon East, Yangon North, Yangon South, Yangon West, Hpa-an, Myitkyina, Taunggyi, and Waw)	
Miss Grand Tachileik	1st	May 12, 2024 at the Legacy Music Theatre, Tachileik	11	~~Zin Lin Nadi Tun~~	~~3~~ (Note: Tachileik, Keng Tung, and Mongpawn)	
Miss Grand Mawlamyine	1st	September 25, 2024, at the Sedona Hotel, Yangon	10	~~Chan Myae Thadar Htet~~	~~2~~ (Note: Mawlamyine and Kyaikto)	
Miss Grand Bago	2nd	Cancelled				
Miss Grand Myitkyina	2nd	March 24, 2025, at the Palm Spring Hotel, Myitkyina	19	Mary Shin	2 (Note: Myitkyina and Hpakant)	
Miss Grand Naypyidaw	2nd	April 11, 2025, at the Hotel Max Naypyidaw, Naypyidaw	11	Ywe Ywe	1	
Miss Grand Taungoo	1st	April 27, 2025, at the Park Royal Hotel, Yangon	9	Moe Thet Khin	3 (Note: Taungoo, Bagan, and Kawthaung)	

== Results ==
=== Main placements ===
Miss Grand Myanmar 2025 competition result by administrative divisions
Symbol key:
Main title winner	Top 11
Supplemental winner	Top 16
Runner-up	Unplaced
Color key for the highest placement obtained by the respective division:
Main title winner	Top 11
Supplemental winner	Top 16
Runner-up	Unplaced
No representative

Position	Candidate
Miss Grand Myanmar 2025	Namhkam – Jawkang Sophia Nawaug
Miss Super Model Myanmar 2025	Mandalay – May Tha Zin Oo
Miss Face of Myanmar 2025	Wine Maw – Hkawng Tsai
1st runner-up	Yangon–East – Ahtin Kaya Po Po
2nd runner-up	Magway – Tharaphil Muang
3rd runner-up	Bhamo – Julie Htoi San
4th runner-up	Hakha – Eaint Mhuu Thwe Aung (Note: Automatically qualified for the top 7 finalists after winning the "Miss Popular Vote" fast track.)
Top 11	Bago – Htoo Htar Ni; Sittwe – Htet Twal Tar Moe; Tachileik – Maran Jar San Ra; Taunggyi – Thinzar Toe Win; Yangon–South – Htet Nadi Htun (Note: Automatically qualified for the top 11 finalists after winning the "Swimsuit Challenge".)
Top 16	Dawei – Kay Mar Kyaw; Kawthaung – Han Htray Zan; Naypyidaw – Ywe Ywe; Taungoo – Moe Thet Khin (Note: Automatically qualified for the top 16 finalists after winning the "City's Power of the Year" fast track.); Yangon–West – Zin Zin Nwe Ni

=== Special awards ===
Award	Winner
City's Power of the Year	Yangon–East – Ahtin Kaya Po Po
Miss Grand Rising Star	Taunggyi – Thinzar Toe Win
Miss Popular Vote	Hakha – Eaint Mhuu Thwe Aung
Miss Congeniality	Bago – Htoo Htar Ni
Miss Real Beauty	Mu Se – Lashi Aung Bu
Miss Photogenic	Wine Maw – Hkawng Tsai
Grand Influencer	Tachileik – Maran Jar San Ra
Miss Sky Net	Wine Maw – Hkawng Tsai
Grand Voice	Namhkam – Jawkang Sophia Nawaug
Best in Talent	Namhkam – Jawkang Sophia Nawaug
Best Introduction	Tachileik – Maran Jar San Ra
Best Evening Gown	Yangon–East – Ahtin Kaya Po Po
Best National Costume	Wine Maw – Hkawng Tsai
Best in Swimsuit Performance	Tachileik – Maran Jar San Ra
Best in National Costume Performance	Magway – Tharaphil Muang
Best National Costume – People's Choice	Namhkam – Jawkang Sophia Nawaug
Award given to the Regional director
Best City Director	Tachileik – TMT Entertainment

== Contestants ==
The following contestants have been confirmed.

District/township	Candidate	Age (Note: Age at the time of the pageant.)	Height	Hometown
Bagan	Ei Ei Phway Aung	26	5 ft 6 in (1.68 m)	Yangon
Bago	Htoo Htar Ni (Note: Appointed to the title without participating in any 2025 related-regional pageant.)	26	5 ft 5 in (1.65 m)	Tharkayta
Bhamo	Julie Htoi San (Note: Appointed Miss Grand Bhamo 2025 after winning the Miss Tsai Lat 2025 regional pageant.)	21	5 ft 8 in (1.73 m)	Momauk
Dawei	Kay Mar Kyaw	24	5 ft 5 in (1.65 m)	Dawei
Hakha	Eaint Mhuu Thwe Aung	22	5 ft 6 in (1.68 m)	Lanmadaw
Hpakant	Christina Wadat Ja Mai Aung	21	5 ft 6 in (1.68 m)	Tatkon
Hpa-an	Waddy May	27	5 ft 5 in (1.65 m)	Hpa-an
Kawthaung	Han Htray Zan	21	5 ft 8 in (1.73 m)	Tigyaing
Kyaikto	Karbra	24	5 ft 6 in (1.68 m)	Kamayut
Magway	Tharaphil Muang (Note: Appointed Miss Grand Magway 2025 after winning the Miss Galaxy Yangon Ambassador 2025 regional pageant.)	21	5 ft 6 in (1.68 m)	Sanchaung
Mandalay	May Tha Zin Oo	23	5 ft 9 in (1.75 m)	Myitkyina
Mawlamyine	Nann Htut May	26	5 ft 5 in (1.65 m)	Mawlamyine
Mudon	Nway Oo Tain Hlwar	21	5 ft 7 in (1.70 m)	Hlaing
Mu Se	Lashi Aung Bu	22	5 ft 6 in (1.68 m)	Mu Se
Myitkyina	Mary Shin	22	5 ft 7 in (1.70 m)	Tatkon
Namhkam	Jawkang Sophia Nawaug	21	5 ft 6 in (1.68 m)	Namhkam
Naypyidaw	Ywe Ywe	19	5 ft 8 in (1.73 m)	Pyinmana
Pyay	Khin Me He Thet	23	5 ft 8 in (1.73 m)	Pyay
Sittwe	Htet Twal Tar Moe	20	5 ft 8 in (1.73 m)	Thuwana
Tachileik	Maran Jar San Ra	22	5 ft 4 in (1.63 m)	Sanchaung
Taunggyi	Thinzar Toe Win	18	5 ft 5 in (1.65 m)	Tamwe
Taungoo	Moe Thet Khin	19	5 ft 6 in (1.68 m)	Yangon
Wine Maw	Hkawng Tsai	23	5 ft 5 in (1.65 m)	Waingmaw
Yangon–East	Ahtin Kaya Po Po	23	5 ft 8 in (1.73 m)	Thingangyun
Yangon–North	Amara Linn Lat	21	5 ft 7 in (1.70 m)	South Okkalapa
Yangon–South	Htet Nadi Htun	20	5 ft 8 in (1.73 m)	Thingangyun
Yangon–West	Zin Zin Nwe Ni	25	5 ft 5 in (1.65 m)	Thaketa

Notes

Withdrawn candidates

The following is the list of Miss Grand Myanmar regional qualifiers, who were expected to compete in the national pageant, but were forced to withdraw due to the change of the national franchise holder.

Color key for preliminary regional stages
Y Yangon Region stage	B Bago Region stage
M Mandalay Region stage	T Tachileik stage

- Y Hpa-an – Hnin Inzali
- T Keng Tung – Nyein Ei San
- M Kyaikto – So Nam
- M Mawlamyine – Chan Myae Thadar Htet
- T Mongpawn – Reina
- Y Myitkyina – Nan No Htun Lwin
- T Tachileik – Zin Lin Nadi Tun
- Y Taunggyi – Nang Hark Hom
- Y Waw – Moe Myint Tapaye
- Y Yangon East – Eaint Hmuu Kay Twel
- Y Yangon North – Su Myat Noe Khin
- Y Yangon South – Htet Eaindra Naing
- Y Yangon West – Nann Su Phway Htun

== List of regional coordinators ==
The following is a list of local organizers accredited by the national licensee to select regional representatives for this year's competition.

- Bagan – Ko Tay Htet Lin Young (1)
- Bago – KZP Entertainment (1)
- Bhamo – Machya Entertainment
- Hakha – Nay Nyo Thwin
- Hpakant – Ko Zaw Mooladu (1)
- Kawthaung – Ko Tay Htet Lin Young (2)
- Kyaikto – KZP Entertainment (2)
- Lashio – Saung Hay Mhan (1)
- Magway – Crown Production
- Mawlamyine – KZP Entertainment (3)
- Mudon – KZP Entertainment (4)
- Mu Se – Aung Ni
- Myitkyina – Ko Zaw Mooladu (2)
- Naypyidaw – Bhone Shein War
- Sittwe – Galaxy Myanmar Organization
- Tachileik – TMT Entertainment
- Taunggyi – KZP Entertainment (5)
- Taungoo – Ko Tay Htet Lin Young (3)
- Waingmaw – Saung Hay Mhan (2)
- Yangon – Halo Event Planning & Production
