= Miss Grand Myanmar 2024 =

2nd Miss Grand Myanmar competition, beauty pageant edition

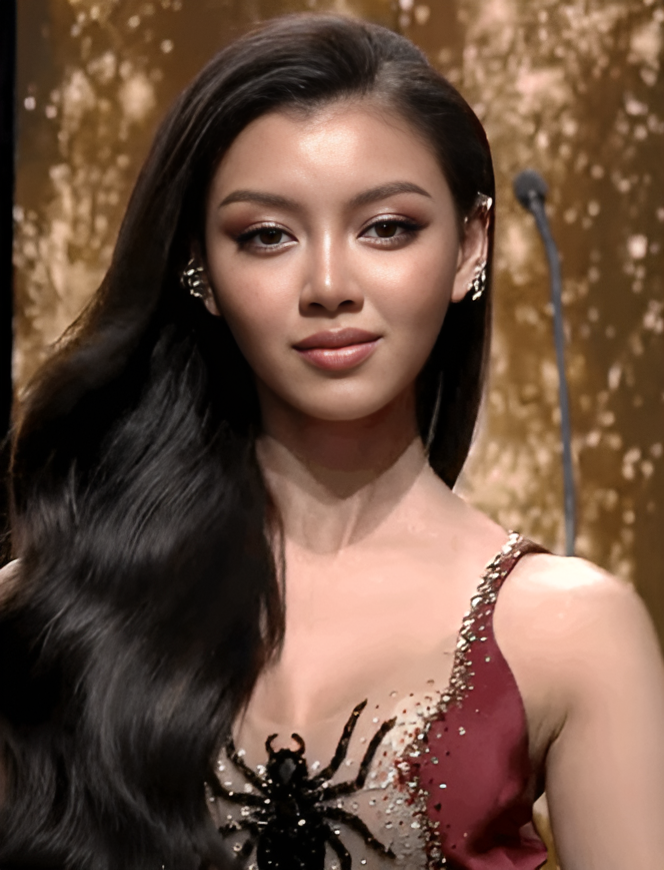
- Thae Su Nyein, the winner of the contest
- Date: December 10, 2023
- Presenters: Ar Warr Lin
- Venue: Hexagon Complex, Shwe Htut Tin Compound, Tamwe Township, Yangon, Myanmar
- Broadcaster: Channel 9, YouTube
- Entrants: 36
- Placements: 21
- Winner: Thae Su Nyein (Taungoo)
- Miss Popular Vote: Nan Khine Shwe Warwin (Myawaddy)
- Best in Swimsuit: Myint Myat Moe (Mudon)

External videos
- Miss Grand Myanmar 2024 Finals

Miss Grand Myanmar 2024 was the 2nd edition of the Miss Grand Myanmar pageant, held at the Hexagon Complex, Shwe Htut Tin Compound in Yangon on December 10, 2023. Fifty-six contestants who have qualified for the national pageant through either the regional preliminary stages or the casting process competed for the title, of whom the representative of Taungoo, Thae Su Nyein, was announced the winner and obtained the right to represent Myanmar in the Miss Grand International 2024 pageant, to be held on October 25, 2023, in Yangon.

The pageant was the first Miss Grand Myanmar organized by Glamorous International after acquiring the license in 2021. Its grand final event was broadcast live to the audience nationwide via Channel 9 and was also attended by Nawat Itsaragrisil and Teresa Chaivisut, the president and vice president of Miss Grand International.

== Background ==
In 2023, after two years of obtaining the Miss Grand Myanmar license, Glamorous International began franchising the regional competitions to individual organizers, who would name regional, state, district, or city titleholders to compete in the 2024 national pageant. The first regional preliminary pageant was held on January 22, 2023, in Mandalay, in which five district representatives, including Mandalay, Amarapura, Kyaukse, Pyin Oo Lwin, and Sagaing, were determined, followed by Yangon Region's contest in March.

== Selection of participants ==
The following is a list of the regions or states that held the local preliminary contests for the Miss Grand Myanmar 2024 pageant.

List of Miss Grand Myanmar 2024 regional pageants, by the coronation date
Pageant	Date & Venue	Entrants	Title(s)	Ref.
Miss Grand Mandalay	22 January 2023 at Rupar Mandalar Resort, Chanayethazan	19	6 titles: Miss Grand Mandalay; Miss Grand Amarapura; Miss Grand Kyaukse; Miss Grand Pyin Oo Lwin; Miss Grand Sagaing; Miss Grand Meiktila	
Miss Grand Yangon	15 March 2023 at Novotel Yangon Max Hotel, Yangon	29	11 titles: Miss Grand East Yangon; Miss Grand North Yangon; Miss Grand South Yangon; Miss Grand West Yangon; Miss Grand Mudon; Miss Grand Pathein; Miss Grand Hpa-an; Miss Grand Myingyan; Miss Grand Bagan; Miss Grand Monywa; Miss Grand Kyaikto; Miss Grand Pyay	
Miss Grand Chin Land	17 May 2023 at Sky Star Hotel, Yangon	16	7 titles: Miss Grand Myeik; Miss Grand Tedim; Miss Grand Matupi; Miss Grand Kalay; Miss Grand Hakha; Miss Grand Paletwa; Miss Grand Kanpetlet	
Miss Grand Bago	21 June 2023 at the Yangon Convention Center (YCC), Yangon	14	14 titles: Miss Grand Bago; Miss Grand Chauck; Miss Grand Daik-U; Miss Grand Magway; Miss Grand Minbu; Miss Grand Pathein; Miss Grand Phyu; Taungdwingyi; Miss Grand Taungoo; Miss Grand Tharyarwady; Miss Grand Thonze; Miss Grand Waw; Miss Grand Yedashe	
Miss Grand Naypyidaw	12 August 2023 at the Yangon Convention Center (YCC), Yangon	15	6 titles: Miss Grand Naypyidaw; Miss Grand Pyinmana; Miss Grand Bhamo; Miss Grand Myawaddy; Miss Grand Sittwe; Miss Grand Thandaung	
Miss Grand Myitkyina	12 September 2023 at Majoi Hall, Myitkyina	14	6 titles: Miss Grand Myitkyina; Miss Grand Hopin; Miss Grand Hpakant; Miss Grand Putao; Miss Grand Tanai; Miss Grand Waingmaw	

== Results ==
=== Placements ===
Placement	Contestant	International Pageant	International Placement
Miss Grand Myanmar 2024	Taungoo – Thae Su Nyein	Miss Grand International 2024	2nd Runner-up (Resigned)
Miss Grand Myanmar 2024	Taungoo – Thae Su Nyein	Miss Cosmo 2026	TBA
1st runner-up	Mudon – Myint Myat Moe (Note: Automatically qualified for the top 20 finalists after winning the "City's Power of the Year" award)	Miss Cosmo 2025	Top 5
2nd runner-up	Bago – Angel Kyi Phyu		
3rd runner-up	Myawaddy – Nan Khine Shwe Warwin (Note: Automatically qualified for the top 6 finalists after winning the fast track "Miss Popular vote") (Note: Resigned)	Miss Earth 2016	Unplaced
3rd runner-up	Hakha – Su Myat Yee (Note: Assumed, formerly 4th runner-up)	Miss Planet International 2024	Withdrew
4th runner-up	Pyin Oo Lwin – Kyaw Kyaw Eaindra (Note: Assumed, formerly 5th runner-up)	Miss Global 2026	4th Runner-up
5th runners-up	Amarapura – Sara Su (Note: Assumed, formerly Top 10)		
Top 10	Hpa-an – Nan Ei Mon Mon Soe; Kyaukse – Ah Hki Zai Pan; Pakokku – Shoon Lae Nay Chi (Note: Assumed, formerly Top 20); West Yangon – Winn Thawdar Aung		
Top 20	Daik-U – Yune Meme Maung; Kanpetlet – Nyein Su Su Thwe; Minbu – Shwe Yamin Oo; Myingyan – Khaing Tha Zin Kyaing; Myitkyina – Helen Dum Doi Ling; Phyu – May La Min; Sittwe – Thet Htar Shwe Zin; Waingmaw – Nan Ya Min Hkaing; East Yangon – Shwe Chuu Ngone		

=== Special awards ===
Award	Contestant
Best in Evening Gown	Kyaukse – Ah Hki Zai Pan
Best in Swimsuit	Mudon – Myint Myat Moe
Best National Costume	Bago – Angel Kyi Phyu; Myawaddy – Nan Khine Shwe Warwin; Phyu – May La Min; West Yangon – Winn Thawdar Aung
City's Power of the Year	Mudon – Myint Myat Moe
National Director Choice Of The Year	Myawaddy – Nan Khine Shwe War Win
Grand Voice Award	Amarapura –Sara Su
Miss Popular Vote	Myawaddy – Nan Khine Shwe Warwin

== Candidates ==
Miss Grand Myanmar 2024 competition result by districts and townships
Color key:
Winner	1st RU	2nd RU
3rd RU	4th RU	Top 10
Top 20	Unplaced	Withdrew
No representative		RU = Runner-up

Initially, fifty-six contestants were confirmed, but twenty withdrew (marked in dark grey), making the final of thirty-six contestants.

District/township	Candidate	Age	Height	Hometown
Amarapura	Sara Su	26	1.74 m (5 ft 8 1/2 in)	Mandalay
Aungban	Nang Hsu Latt Pyae			
Bagan (T)	Theint Naychi	24	1.65 m (5 ft 5 in)	Myitkyina
Bago	Angel Kyi Phyu	21	1.73 m (5 ft 8 in)	Yangon
Bhamo	Winn Thiri Aung	21	1.65 m (5 ft 5 in)	
Chauk	Htet Nadi Htun	18	1.70 m (5 ft 7 in)	Yangon
Daik-U (T)	Yune Meme Maung	25	1.71 m (5 ft 7 1/2 in)	Yangon
Hakha	Su Myat Yee	26	1.75 m (5 ft 9 in)	Dawei
Hopin	Nhkum Boi Ja Seng Mun	20	1.68 m (5 ft 6 in)	Hopin
Hpakant	Maran Ja Seng	20	1.68 m (5 ft 6 in)	Myitkyina
Hpa-An	Nan Ei Mon Mon Soe	18	1.75 m (5 ft 9 in)	Hlaingbwe
Kalay	Hnin Pwint Taw	21	1.68 m (5 ft 6 in)	Ye
Kanpetlet (T)	Nyein Su Su Thwe	19	1.63 m (5 ft 4 in)	Yangon
Kengtung	Poe Haythar Han			
Kyaikto (T)	Phyo Thin Zar Zaw	23	1.68 m (5 ft 6 in)	Yangon
Kyaukse	Ah Hki Zai Pan	21	1.70 m (5 ft 7 in)	Myitkyina
Magway	Yin Myo May	24	1.67 m (5 ft 5 1/2 in)	Yangon
Mandalay	Khat Wai Moe	27	1.70 m (5 ft 7 in)	Mandalay
Matupi	Phue Wai Thwin	20	1.68 m (5 ft 6 in)	Yangon
Mawlamyine	Pann La Yaung			
Meiktila	Su Htet Myat	19	1.68 m (5 ft 6 in)	Mandalay
Minbu	Shwe Yamin Oo	24	1.70 m (5 ft 7 in)	Yangon
Mogok (T)	May Myat Thu Kyi	26	1.70 m (5 ft 7 in)	Mandalay
Mudon (T)	Myint Myat Moe	18	1.80 m (5 ft 11 in)	Yangon
Monywa	Thae Nan-Di Zen	19	1.68 m (5 ft 6 in)	Yangon
Myawaddy	Nan Khine Shwe Warwin	25	1.70 m (5 ft 7 in)	Myawaddy
Myeik	Shwe Yati Oo	28	1.73 m (5 ft 8 in)	Myeik
Myingyan	Khaing Tha Zin Kyaing	20	1.66 m (5 ft 5 1/2 in)	Meiktila
Myitkyina	Helen Dum Doi Ling	19	1.73 m (5 ft 8 in)	Myitkyina
Naypyidaw	Shwe Bon Than Tar	20	1.70 m (5 ft 7 in)	
Pakokku	Shoon Lae Nay Chi	16	1.68 m (5 ft 6 in)	Thanlyin
Paletwa	Ngu Wah Thin	19	1.68 m (5 ft 6 in)	Yangon
Pathein	Engyin Phoo	24	1.65 m (5 ft 5 in)	Meiktila
Putao (T)	Latang Ze Naw	20	1.68 m (5 ft 6 in)	
Pyay	Khin Phoo Phoo Thet	24	1.70 m (5 ft 7 in)	Kengtung
Pyinmana	May Thazin Myint Aung	24	1.70 m (5 ft 7 in)	
Pyin Oo Lwin	Kyaw Kyaw Eaindra	16	1.73 m (5 ft 8 in)	Yangon
Pyu (T)	May La Min	18	1.68 m (5 ft 6 in)	Naypyidaw
Sagaing	Honey Zaw	16	1.75 m (5 ft 9 in)	
Sittwe	Thet Htar Shwe Zin	16	1.73 m (5 ft 8 in)	
Tachileik	Yoon Thadar Chal			
Tanai (T)	Elizabeth Roi Htoi	22	1.73 m (5 ft 8 in)	Tanai
Taungdwingyi (T)	Sandi Mgmg Myint	24	1.65 m (5 ft 5 in)	Yangon
Taungoo	Thae Su Nyein	16	1.71 m (5 ft 7 1/2 in)	Yangon
Tedim	Winnie Rose	20	1.63 m (5 ft 4 in)	
Thanbyuzayat	Nang May Myat Linn			
Thandaung (T)	Cherry Jue	16	1.65 m (5 ft 5 in)	
Tharyarwady	Hsu Hlaing Hnin	22	1.65 m (5 ft 5 in)	Mawlamyinegyun
Thonze (C)	Zune Meme Htin Zaw	19	1.69 m (5 ft 6 1/2 in)	Mawlamyine
Waingmaw (T)	Nan Ya Min Hkaing	19	1.68 m (5 ft 6 in)	Waingmaw
Waw (T)	Pann Thiri Bo	18	1.68 m (5 ft 6 in)	Yangon
Yangon East	Shwe Chuu Ngone	22	1.73 m (5 ft 8 in)	Bago
Yangon North	Kay Khine Kyaw Zin	24	1.73 m (5 ft 8 in)	Yangon
Yangon South	Nang Cherry	23	1.70 m (5 ft 7 in)	Yangon
Yangon West	Winn Thawdar Aung	22	1.70 m (5 ft 7 in)	Yangon
Yedashe (T)	May Thara Wun	16	1.70 m (5 ft 7 in)	Yangon

Note

- (T): Township-level representatives
- (C): City-level representatives
- The original representative of Pathein, Yoon Phyu Sin Nwe, could not participate due to her mother's unstable health, and Engyin Phoo was assigned as the replacement.
