= Miss Grand Myanmar =

National beauty pageant in Myanmar

- ငြိမ်းချမ်းရေးအလှမယ် မြန်မာ
- Formation: August 7, 2016; 10 years ago
- Type: Beauty pageant
- Headquarters: Yangon
- Location: Myanmar
- Members: Miss Grand International
- Official language: Burmese, English
- National Director: Maran Seng Naw (2025)
- Parent organization: M Entertainment
- Website: Official Website

Miss Grand Myanmar
licensees timeline

Stand-alone pageant
Under another pageant
Appointed titleholder

Miss Grand Myanmar (Burmese: ငြိမ်းချမ်းရေးအလှမယ် မြန်မာ) is an annual female national beauty pageant of Myanmar, founded in 2016 by Yangon-based event organizer Style Plus H. Previously, from 2013 to 2014, the license belonged to the Miss Golden Land Myanmar organization, and then it was under the proprietary of the Miss Universe Myanmar organizer, Hello Madam, during 2017 – 2020. Since 2021, the Glamorous International, headed by a Burmese overseas in Thailand, Htoo Ant Lwin, has been responsible for sending Myanmar delegates to compete at Miss Grand International.

Since its first participation in 2013, Myanmar has never won the Miss Grand International but holds a record of 5 placements in such; the highest position is the first runner-up, obtained by Ni Ni Lin Eain in 2023.

The reigning Miss Grand Myanmar is Christine Nan Seng of Hpakant, who was crowned on 20 July 2026 at a special studio ceremony following the recent religious costume controversy that postponed the pageant. She is set to represent Myanmar at Miss Grand International 2026.

== History ==
Since the establishment of Miss Grand International in 2013, Myanmar has always sent its representatives to compete at such every year. However, its first three candidates from 2013 to 2015 were either handpicked or determined through the "Miss Golden Land Myanmar" pageant. Later in 2016, the first competition of Miss Grand Myanmar was conducted after the Yangon-based event organizer Style Plus H had obtained the license, the contest was held at City Hall of Pyin Oo Lwin, featuring 24 national finalists, of which, Nandar Lwin from Yangon was named the winner and no contest was additionally held since then, the license was transferred to different organizers.

During 2017 – 2020, Miss Universe Myanmar Organization was responsible for selecting the representatives of Myanmar for Miss Grand international pageants. At that time, the 1st Runner-Up of Miss Universe Myanmar represented the country in Miss Grand International. Since 2021, the Glamorous International, chaired by Htoo Ant Lwin, has been responsible for selecting and sending Myanmar representatives to the international stage.

Since 2024, several regional pageants have been held to determine their representatives for the national contest, as listed below.

- Miss Grand Bago (est. 2024)
- Miss Grand Chinland (est. 2024)
- Miss Grand Mandalay (est. 2024)
- Miss Grand Myitkyina (est. 2024)
- Miss Grand Naypyidaw (est. 2024)
- Miss Grand Yangon (est. 2024)

== Controversies ==
=== Religious costume controversy ===
On 5 May 2026, the Miss Grand Myanmar Organization announced the expulsion of contestant Ei Mon Lwin, who represented Tachilek, following controversy surrounding her appearance in a Buddhist nun's outfit during the preliminary National Costume competition held at the Eravati Sule Grand Hotel in Yangon.

During the performance on 4 May, Ei Mon Lwin wore traditional Buddhist nun robes while depicting scenes of meditation and a traditional ear-piercing ceremony. Videos of the performance circulated widely on social media and sparked criticism from members of the public, who considered the use of Buddhist religious imagery in a beauty pageant inappropriate and disrespectful.

National director U Mahran Seng Naw stated that the contestant had violated contractual rules prohibiting conduct that could damage Myanmar's dignity or disrespect religions. According to the organization, the costume had not been presented during rehearsals and had not received official approval from pageant organizers.

Following the controversy, local media reported that the Ministry of Religious Affairs and Culture coordinated with the Ministry of Home Affairs to investigate the incident.

Several local reports also stated that the Eravati Sule Yangon venue sponsor received a six-month shutdown order in connection with the incident.

== Editions ==
=== Location and date ===
The following list is the edition detail of the Miss Grand Myanmar contest, since its inception in 2016.

Edition	Date	Final venue	Entrants	Ref.
1st	7 August 2016	City Hall of Pyin Oo Lwin, Mandalay	24	
2nd	10 December 2023	Hexagon Complex, Shwe Htut Tin Compound, Tamwe Township, Yangon	36	
3rd	21 June 2025	Hexagon Complex, Shwe Htut Tin Compound, Tamwe Township, Yangon	27	
4th	20 July 2026	Eravati Sule Grand Hotel, Yangon	26	

=== Competition result ===
Edition	Winner	Runners-up					Ref.
Edition	Winner	First	Second	Third	Fourth	Fifth	Ref.
1st	Nandar Lwin (Yangon)	May Phuu Pwint Nwe (Yangon)	Cherry Htun (Taunggyi)	Not awarded			
2nd	Thae Su Nyein (Taungoo)	Myint Myat Moe (Mudon)	Angel Kyi Phyu (Bago)	Su Myat Yee (Note: Assumed) (Hakha) Nan Khine Shwe Warwin (Note: Resigned) (Myawaddy)	Kyaw Kyaw Eaindra (Pyin Oo Lwin)	Sara Su (Amarapura)	
3rd	Jawkang Sophia Nawaug (Namhkam)	Ahtin Kaya Po Po (Yangon)	Tharaphil Muang (Magway)	Julie Htoi San (Bhamo)	Eaint Mhuu Thwe Aung (Hakha)	Not awarded	
4th	Christine Nan Seng (Hpakant)	Han Htray Zan (Mandalay)	Htet Twal Tar Moe (Sittwe)	Han Thiri Kyaw (Mudon)	May Myat Noe Khin (North Yangon)	Not awarded	

== International competition ==
=== Miss Grand International ===
The following is a list of Myanmar representatives at the Miss Grand International contest.

Color keys

- : Declared as the winner
- : Ended as a runner-up (Top 5)
- : Ended as a finalist (Top 10)
- : Ended as a semifinalist (Top 20/21)
- : Ended as special awards winner

Year	Town	Miss Grand Myanmar	Title	Placement	Special Awards	National Licensee
2026	Hpakant	Christine Nan Seng	Miss Grand Myanmar 2026	Unplaced		M Entertainment
2025	Namhkam	JK Sophia	Miss Grand Myanmar 2025	Unplaced		M Entertainment
2024	Taungoo	Thae Su Nyein	Miss Grand Myanmar 2024	2nd Runner-up (Note: Later dethroned)	Miss Beauty Skin; I'Aura Queen	Mingalarpar Miss Myanmar (Glamorous International)
2023	Mudon	Ni Ni Lin Eain	Appointed	1st Runner-up	Miss Popular Vote; Country's Power of the Year	Mingalarpar Miss Myanmar (Glamorous International)
2022	Thailand	Ei Ei Aung Htunt	Miss Grand Thailand 2022 Top 20	Unplaced		Mingalarpar Miss Myanmar (Glamorous International)
2021	Kengtung	Amara Shune Lei	Miss Earth Myanmar 2020	Top 20		Mingalarpar Miss Myanmar (Glamorous International)
2020	Myawaddy	Han Lay	1st runner-up Miss Universe Myanmar 2020	Top 20		Miss Universe Myanmar (Hello Madam Media)
2019	Myeik	Hmwe Thet	1st runner-up Miss Universe Myanmar 2019	Unplaced		Miss Universe Myanmar (Hello Madam Media)
2018	Naypyitaw	Su Myat Phoo	1st runner-up Miss Universe Myanmar 2018	Unplaced		Miss Universe Myanmar (Hello Madam Media)
2017	Yangon	Shwe Eain Si (Note: Resigned)	1st runner-up Miss Universe Myanmar 2017	Did not compete		Miss Universe Myanmar (Hello Madam Media)
2017	Yangon	Aye Chan Moe (Note: Successor)	1st runner-up Miss Universe Myanmar 2013	Unplaced		Miss Universe Myanmar (Hello Madam Media)
2016	Yangon	Nandar Lwin	Miss Grand Myanmar 2016	Unplaced		Style Plus H
2015	Yangon	San Htate Htar Linn	Appointed	Unplaced		Style Plus H
2014	Myitkyina	M Ja Seng	Miss Golden Land Grand Myanmar 2014	Unplaced		Miss Golden Land Myanmar
2013	Kalay	Htar Htet Htet	Appointed	Top 20	Miss Popular Vote	Miss Golden Land Myanmar

=== Miss Planet International ===
The following is a list of Bamar representatives at the Miss Planet International contest.

Color keys

- : Declared as the winner
- : Ended as a runner-up (Top 5)
- : Ended as a finalist (Top 10)
- : Ended as a semifinalist (Top 20/21)
- : Ended as special awards winner

Year	Town	Miss Planet Myanmar	Title	Placement	Special Awards	National Director
2024	Dawei	Su Myat Yi	Miss Grand Myanmar 2024 (3rd Runner-up)	Did not compete		Glamorous International

=== Miss Teen International ===
The following is a list of Bamar representatives at the Miss Teen International contest.

Color keys

- : Declared as the winner
- : Ended as a runner-up (Top 5)
- : Ended as a finalist (Top 10)
- : Ended as a semifinalist (Top 20/21)
- : Ended as special awards winner

Year	Town	Miss Teen International Myanmar	Title	Placement	Special Awards	National Director
2024	Thanlyin	Shoon Lae Nay Chi	Miss Grand Myanmar 2024 (Top 10)	Did not compete		Glamorous International

=== Miss Celebrity International ===
The following is a list of Bamar representatives at the Miss Celebrity International contest.

Color keys

- : Declared as the winner
- : Ended as a runner-up (Top 5)
- : Ended as a finalist (Top 10)
- : Ended as a semifinalist (Top 20/21)
- : Ended as special awards winner

Year	Town	Miss Teen International Myanmar	Title	Placement	Special Awards	National Director
2023	Bago	Shwe Chuu Ngone	Miss Grand Myanmar 2024 (Top 20)	Unplaced		Glamorous International

== Trivia ==
=== National Directors ===
1. Wai Yan Aung (2013–2014)
2. Hla Nu Htun (2015–2016)
3. Soe Yu Wai (2017–2020)
4. Htoo Ant Lwin (2021–2024)
5. Maran Seng Naw (2025)

=== Franchise Holders ===
1. Miss Golden Land Myanmar Organization (2013–2014)
2. Style Plus H Organization (2015–2016)
3. Hello Madam Media Group Co., Ltd. (2017–2020)
4. Glamorous International (2021–2024)
5. M Entertainment (2025)

== Winner gallery ==
Miss Grand Myanmar 2026
Christine Nan Seng

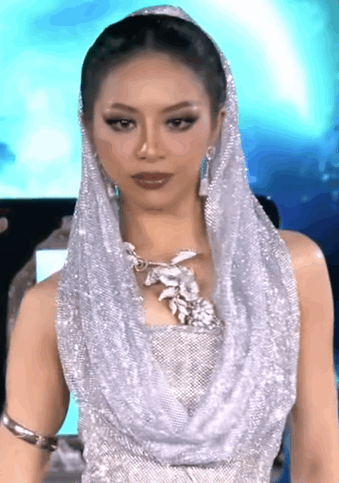
Miss Grand Myanmar 2025
Jaukang Nu San Pan

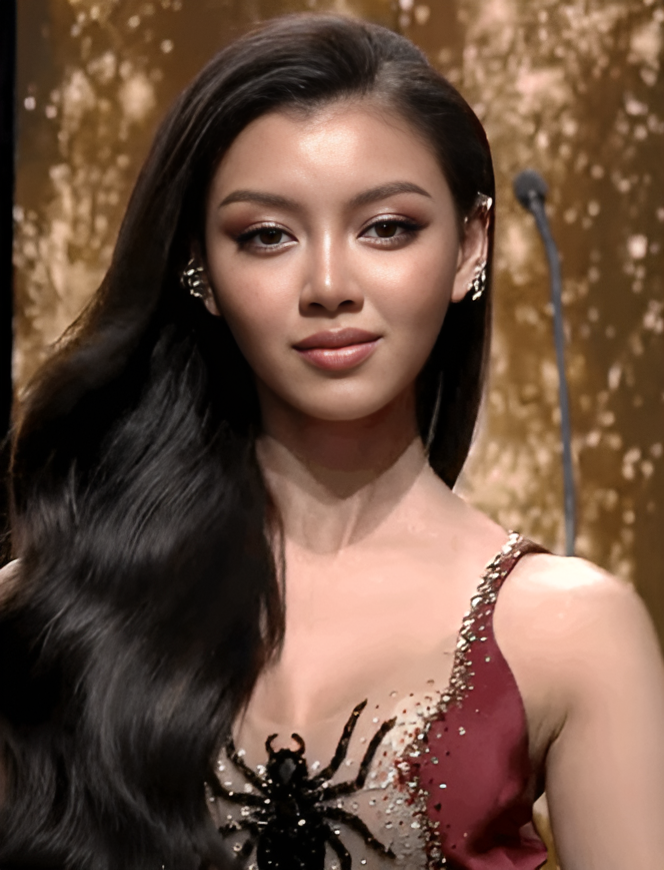
Miss Grand Myanmar 2024
Thae Su Nyein

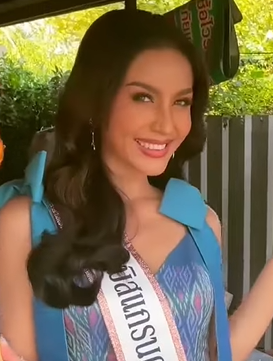
Miss Grand Myanmar 2022
Ei Ei Aung Htunt

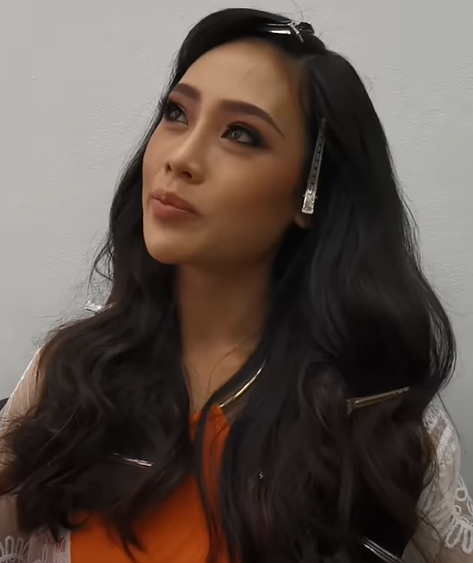
Miss Grand Myanmar 2021
Amara Shune Lei

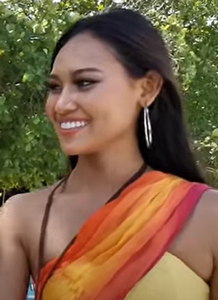
Miss Grand Myanmar 2020
Han Lay

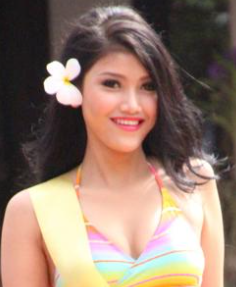
Miss Grand Myanmar 2014
M Ja Seng

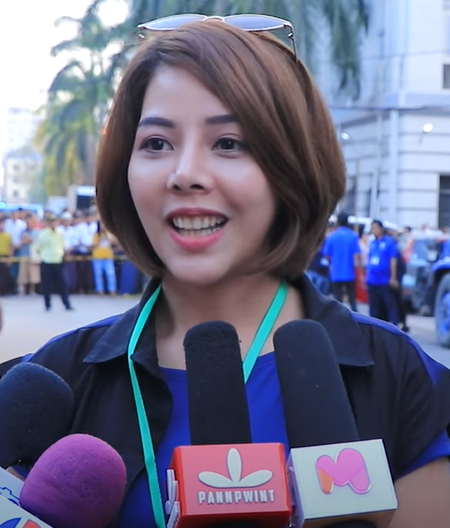
Miss Grand Myanmar 2013
Htar Htet Htet

City by number of wins

List of Cities by number of Miss Grand Myanmar wins
Number of wins	City	Years
3	(Yangon Region) Yangon	2015, 2016, 2017*
1	(Bago Region) Taungoo	2024
1	(Mon State) Mudon	2023
1	Tak, Thailand	2022
1	(Shan State) Kengtung	2021
1	(Kayin State) Myawaddy	2020
1	Myeik	2019
1	Naypyidaw	2018
1	(Kachin State) Myitkyina	2014
1	(Sagaing Region) Kalay	2013

== See also ==
- List of beauty pageants
