= Paung =

ပံင် ပေါင်
- Town
- Paung
- Location in Burma
- Coordinates: 16°37′22″N 97°27′37″E
- Country: Myanmar
- Division: Mon State
- District: Thaton District
- Township: Paung Township

Population (2005)
  - Religions: Buddhism
- Time zone: UTC+6.30 (MST)

Paung (Burmese: ပေါင်မြို့; Mon: ဍုၚ်ပံၚ်, [pɔŋ]) is a town in the Mon State of south-east Myanmar. Mt.Nwar-la-boet (Cow's hump Mt) in Kyon Ka Village is well known and at the top of the mountain, pilgrims can pay homage to the small stupa in which sacred hair relic of Buddha is enshrined. One can also enjoy the unique beauty of surroundings from there.
