= Zin Kyaik =

Zin Kyaik ဍုၚ်ဇိုၚ်ကျာ် ဇင်းကျိုက်မြို့
- Town
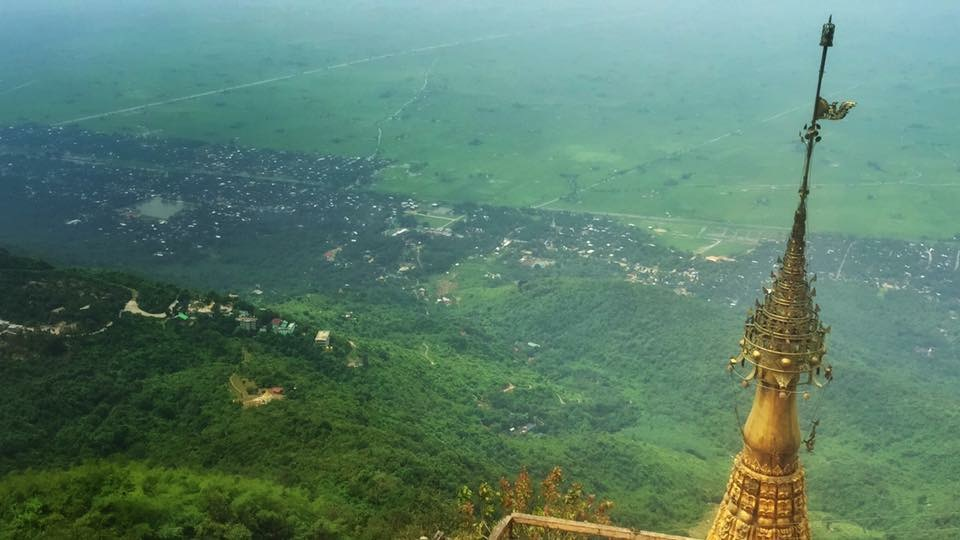
- Zin Kyaik town seen from Mount Zin Kyaik

- Zin Kyaik Location
- Coordinates: 16.69655°N 97.42371°E
- Country: Myanmar
- State: Mon State
- District: Thaton District
- Township: Paung Township
- Time zone: UTC+6.30 (Myanmar Standard Time)

Zin Kyaik (Burmese: ဇင်းကျိုက်မြို့; Mon: ဍုၚ်ဇိုၚ်ကျာ်) is a town located in Paung Township, Thaton District, Mon State of Myanmar. The Rock Ship Waterfall Resort in Zin Kyaik is frequently visited by tourists and foreigners.

== Photos ==
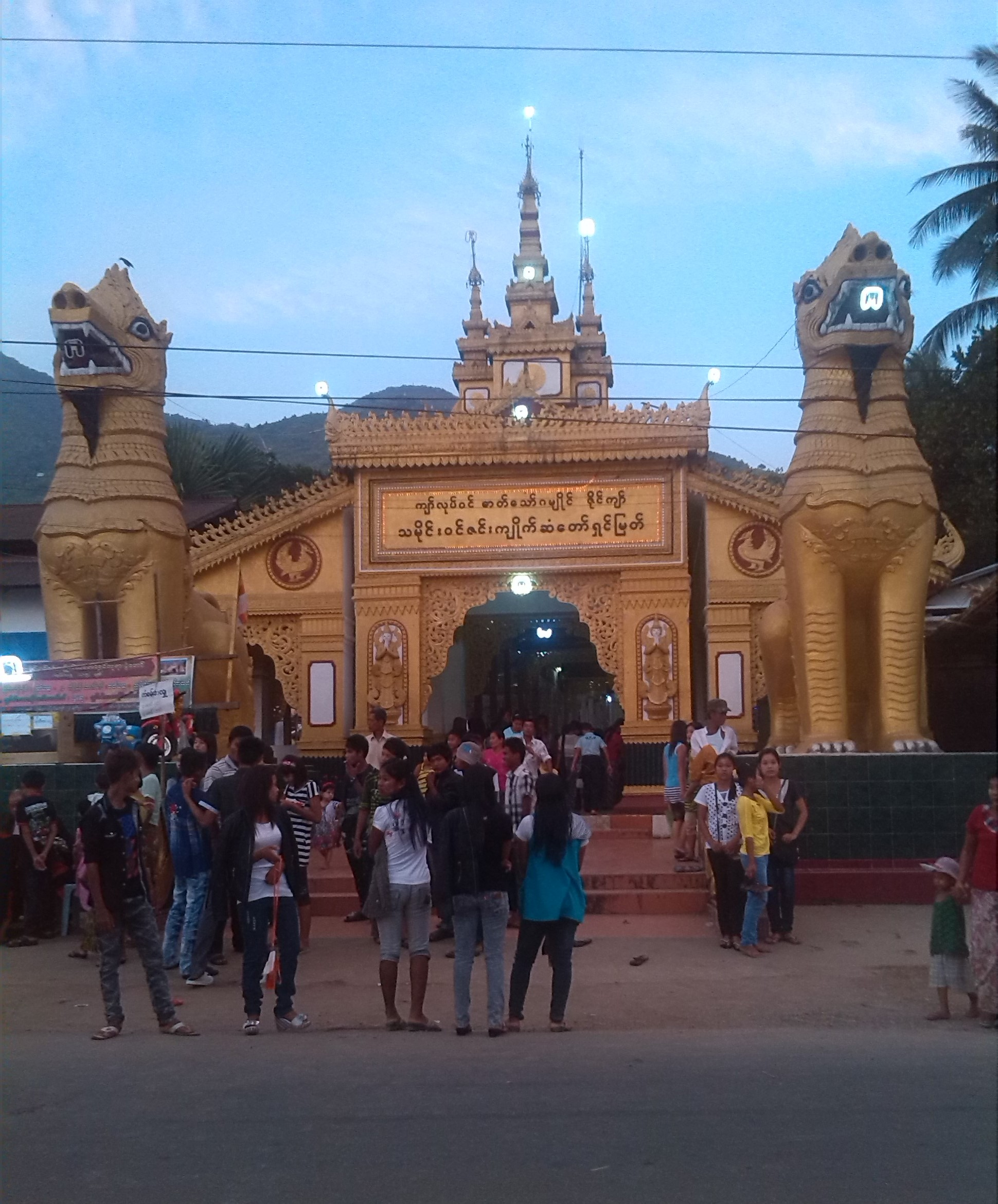
Historic Zin Kyaik Sandaw Shin Pagoda

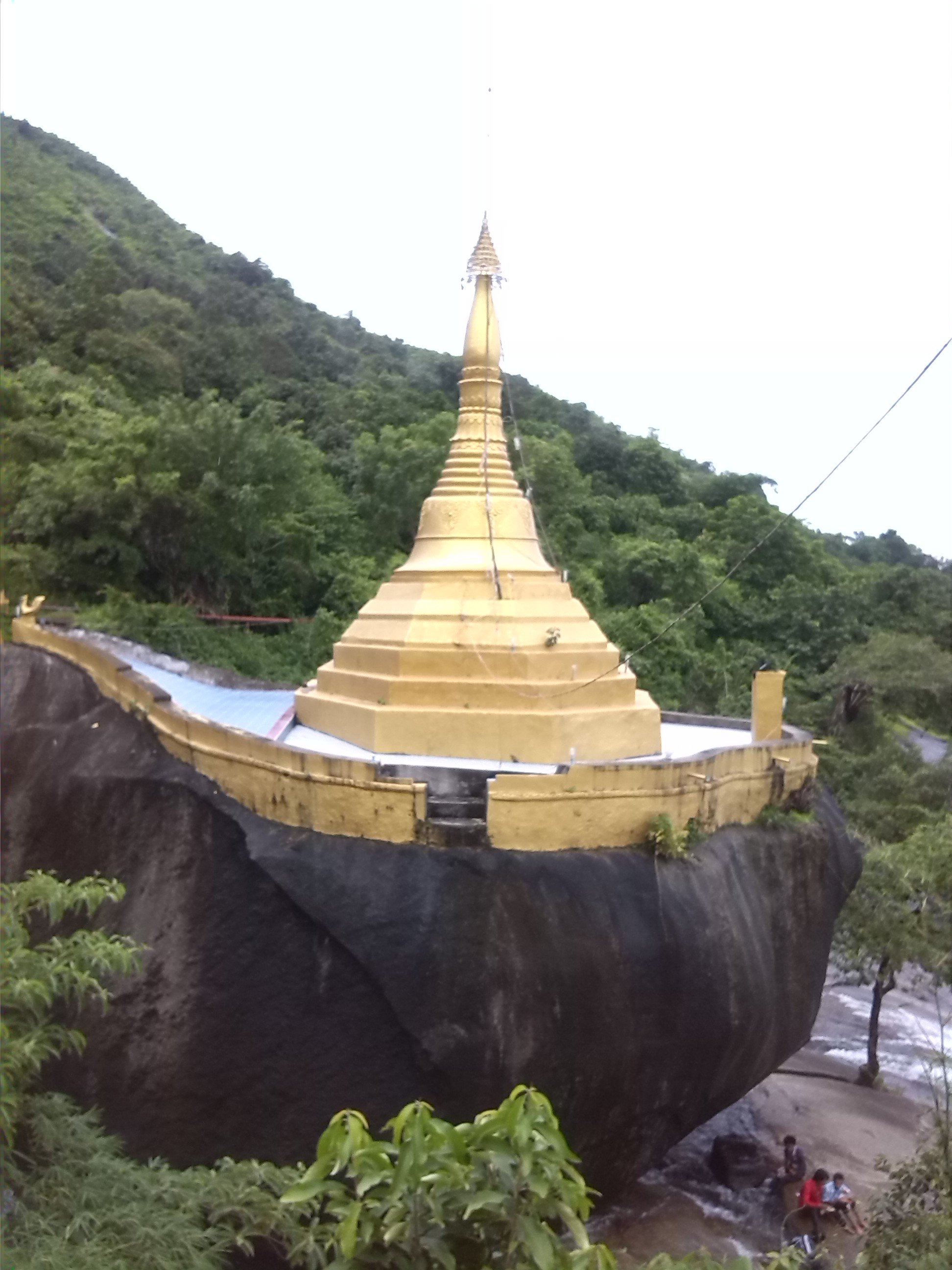
Zin Kyaik Stone Ship Pagoda

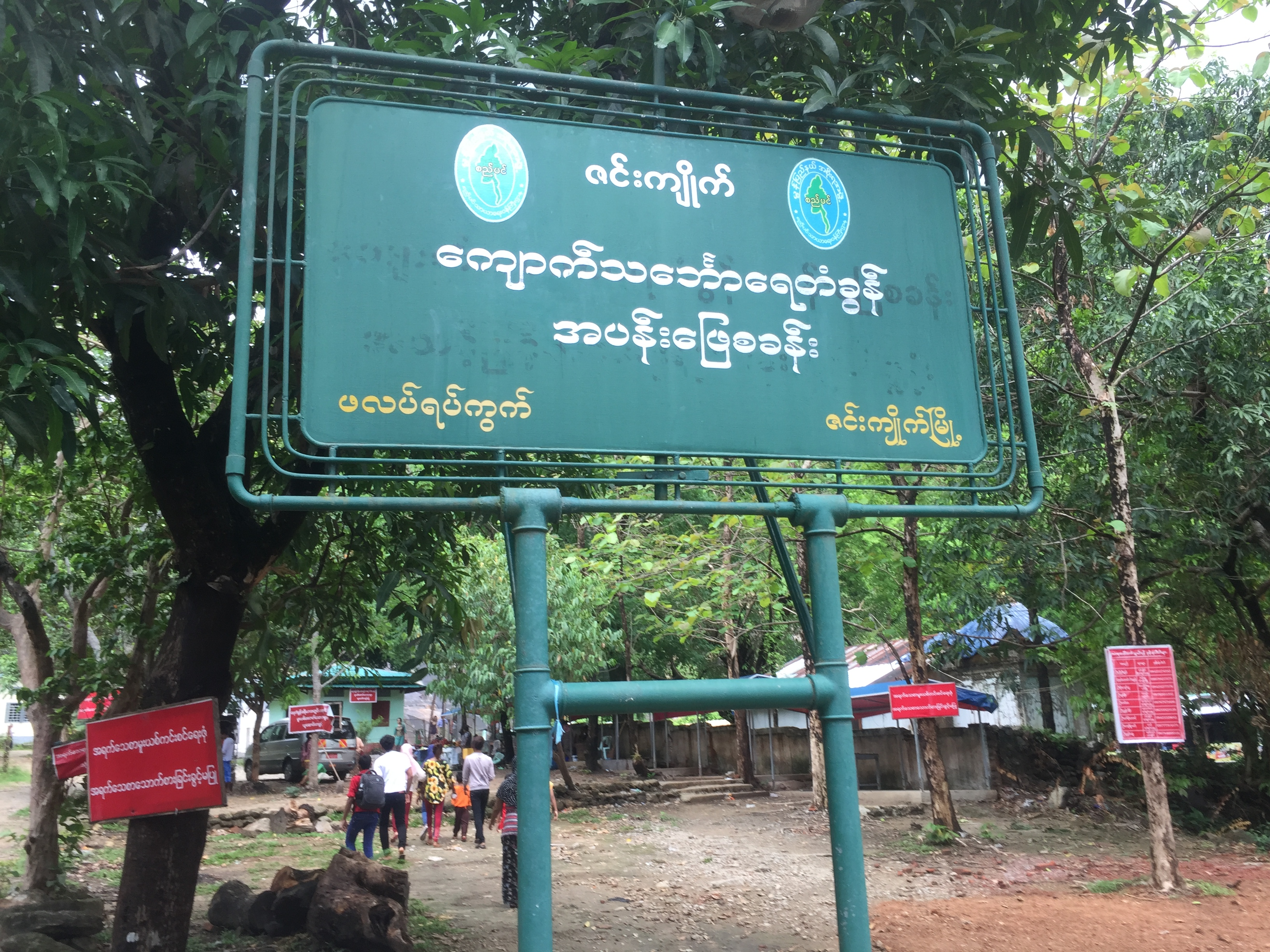
Stone Ship Waterfall Resort
