= Thuwanawaddy =

သုဝဏ္ဏဝတီမြို့ Thuwanawaddy
- City
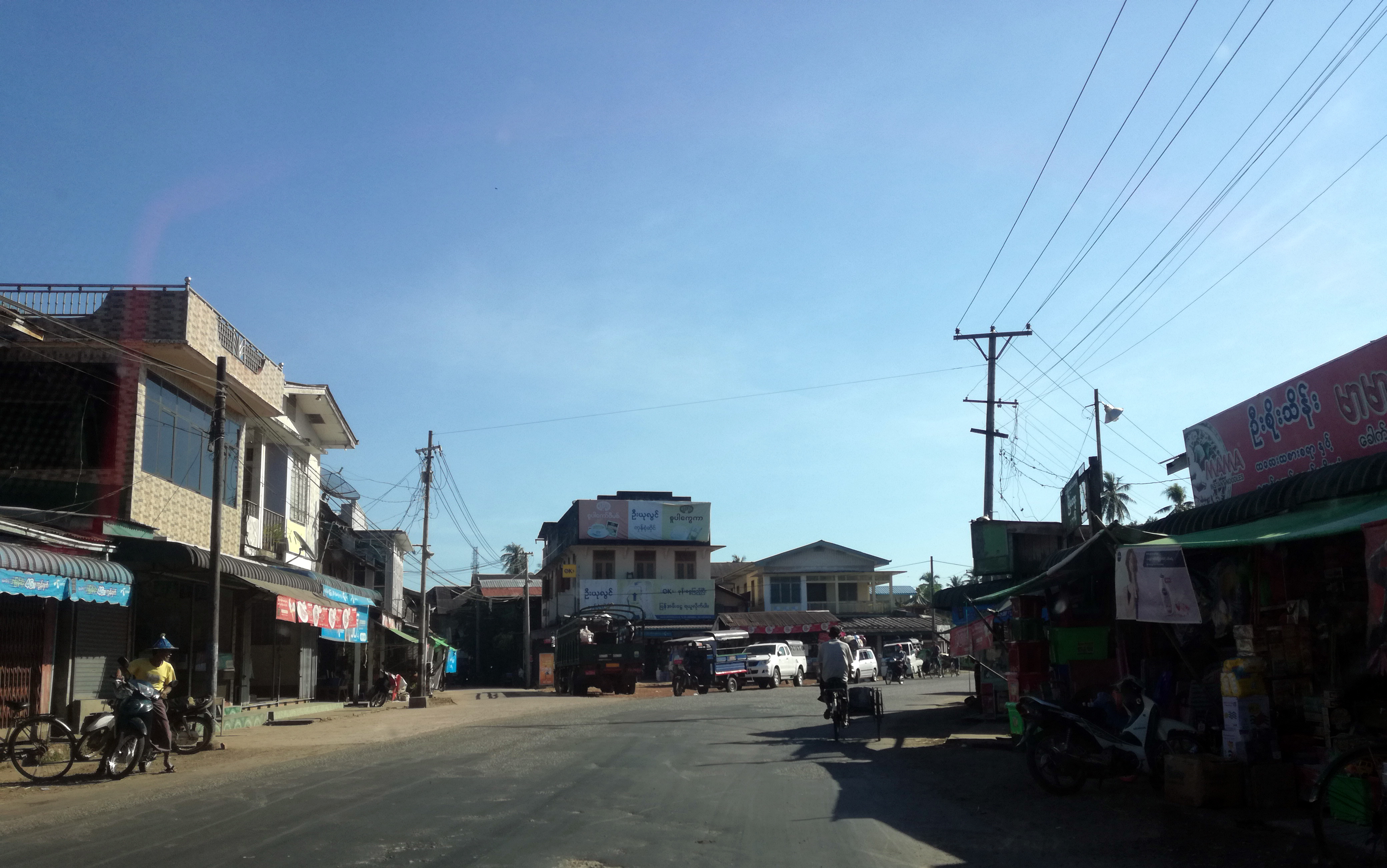

- Thuwanawaddy Location
- Coordinates: 17.060222°N 97.304815°E
- Country: Myanmar
- State: Mon State
- District: Thaton District
- Township: Thaton Township
- Time zone: UTC+6.30 (Myanmar Standard Time)

Thuwanawaddy (Burmese: သုဝဏ္ဏဝတီမြို့ ; Mon: ဍုၚ်သုဝဏ္ဏဝတဳ ) is a small town located in Thaton District, Mon State of Myanmar. The town was formed by combining nearby three village tracts, Kyaik Kaw, Thein Seik, and Taungkya.
