= Hla Myint Than =

Burmese politician

Member of the Amyotha Hluttaw
- Incumbent
- Assumed office 3 February 2016
- Constituency: Mon State № 11

Personal details
- Born: 26 December 1964 (age 61) Kyaikto, Mon State, Myanmar
- Party: National League for Democracy
- Spouse: Khin Htay Myint
- Children: 4
- Parent(s): U Than (father); Daw Tin (mother)
- Education: B.Sc., H.G.P, R.L
- Alma mater: Mawlamyaing University; Yangon University

Hla Myint Than also Hla Myint (Burmese: လှမြင့်သန်း, born 26 December 1964) is a Burmese politician and currently serving as an Amyotha Hluttaw MP for Mon State No. 11 constituency. He is a member of the National League for Democracy.

== Early life and education ==
Hla Myint Than was born on 26 December 1964 in Kyaikto, Mon State, Myanmar. He graduated with B.Sc., H.G.P, R.L from Mawlamyaing University and Yangon University. He served as the chairman of NLD Bago. He is a member of central campaign Department of Bago Township and also a member of the center Peasant Affairs Committee.

== Political career ==
He is a member of the National League for Democracy. In the 2015 Myanmar general election, he was elected as an Amyotha Hluttaw MP and elected representative from Mon State No. 11 parliamentary constituency.
