= Buanlung =

- Village
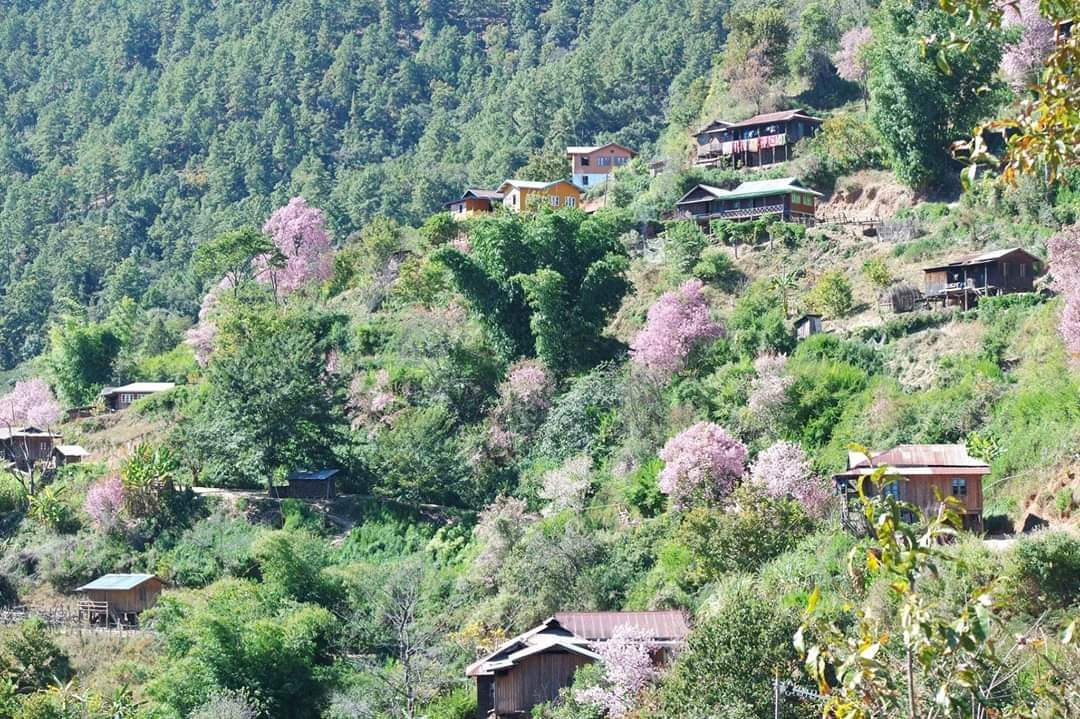

- Location in Myanmar
- Coordinates: 22°29′52″N 93°32′18″E
- Country: Myanmar
- Region: Chin State
- District: Hakha District
- Township: Hakha Township
- Time zone: UTC+6.30 (MST)

Buanlung is a village in Hakha Township, Hakha District, in the Chin state of western Myanmar.
