= Miss Grand Yangon =

Regional beauty pageant in Myanmar

Miss Grand Yangon ငြိမ်းချမ်းရေးအလှမယ် ရန်ကုန်
- Formation: March 15, 2023; 3 years ago
- Type: Beauty pageant
- Headquarters: Yangon
- Location: Myanmar
- Official language: Burmese
- Titles: 4 main titles: Miss Grand East Yangon; Miss Grand North Yangon; Miss Grand South Yangon; Miss Grand West Yangon
- Affiliations: Miss Grand Myanmar

Miss Grand Yangon (Burmese: ငြိမ်းချမ်းရေးအလှမယ် ရန်ကုန်) is a Myanmar's local female beauty pageant in the region of Yangon, founded in 2024 as a preliminary stage for the Miss Grand Myanmar national pageant. In addition to determining the four district representatives of the region, some finalists were also assigned to represent other districts outside the Region of Yangon to compete in the national event.

Yangon has not yet won the Miss Grand Myanmar contest. The highest placement of Yangon was in the Top 10, achieved by Winn Thawdar Aung of South Yangon in 2024. Miss Grand Yangon have been discontinued. Due to problems with the Organization.

== History ==
The Miss Grand Yangon pageant was organized for the first time in 2024 to select four representatives for the Miss Grand Myanmar 2024 national pageant. The organizer then extended the license to 2025, in which its four winners were expected to participate in the 2025 national contest, but due to the national franchise change, the four Yangon winners were automatically disqualified; they later participated in the Miss World Myanmar 2025 instead.

== Editions ==
=== Date and venue ===
The following table details Miss Grand Yangon's annual editions since 2024.

Edition	Date	Final venue	Entrants	Ref.
1st	March 15, 2023	Novotel Yangon Max Hotel, Yangon	29	
2nd (Note: The competition result was canceled due to the change of national and regional licensees.)	3 April 2024	Sedona Hotel, Yangon	12	

=== Competition results ===
Traditionally since 2024 the Miss Grand Yangon will be representing Yangon Region as Miss Yangon East, Yangon North, Yangon South, and Yangon West at the Miss Grand Myanmar pageant.

Edition	Winners				Ref.
Edition	Miss Yangon East	Miss Yangon North	Miss Yangon South	Miss Yangon West	Ref.
1st	Shwe Chuu Ngone	Kay Khine Kyaw Zin	Winn Thawdar Aung	Nang Cherry	
2nd	Eaint Mhuu Khit Twin	Su Myat Noe Khin	Thet Eaindra Nhine	Nang Su Pwint Pwint Htun	

== National competition ==
The following is a list of representatives of Yangon in the Miss Grand Myanmar national pageant.

Year	Miss Grand East Yangon	Miss Grand North Yangon	Miss Grand West Yangon	Miss Grand South Yangon	Ref.
2024	Shwe Chuu Ngone (Top 20)	Kay Khine Kyaw Zin (Withdrew)	Nang Cherry (Withdrew)	Winn Thawdar Aung (Top 10)	
2025	Eaint Mhuu Khit Twin (Did not compete) (Note: Disqualified from the national pageant due to the change of national licensee.)	Su Myat Noe Khin (Did not compete)	Thet Eaindra Nhine (Did not compete)	Nang Su Pwint Pwint Htun (Did not compete)	
2025	Ahtin Kaya Po Po (Note: Appointed to the title without participating in any 2025 related-regional pageant.) (1st runner-up)	Amara Linn Lat (Unplaced)	Zin Zin Nwe Ni (Top 16)	Htet Nadi Htun (Top 11)	
