= Han Lay =

Burmese model and beauty queen (born 1999)

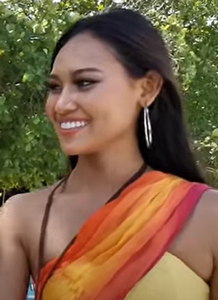
- Born: Thaw Nandar Aung; 1999 (age 26–27); Myawaddy, Myanmar
- Height: 5 ft 8 in (173 cm)
- Beauty pageant titleholder
- Title: Miss Grand Myanmar 2020
- Major competitions: Miss Universe Myawaddy 2019 (Winner); Miss Universe Myanmar 2020 (1st runner up) (Best Smile Award); Miss Grand International 2020 (Top 20)

Thaw Nandar Aung (born 1999), known as Han Lay, is a Burmese beauty pageant titleholder, model, and activist. Han Lay was crowned Miss Grand Myanmar 2020 and represented Myanmar at Miss Grand International 2020, where she finished in the Top 20.

== Early life and education ==
Han Lay was born on 1999 in Myawaddy. She attended Yangon University, studying psychology.

== Pageantry ==
Han Lay competed at Miss Universe Myawaddy 2019, representing Myawaddy, where she won the title at Miss Universe Myanmar 2020.

On 30 December 2020, Han Lay was crowned as first runner-up of Miss Universe Myanmar 2020 by outgoing titleholder Hmwe Thet.

=== Miss Grand International 2020 ===
On 27 March 2021, she represented Myanmar at the Miss Grand International 2020 pageant held in Bangkok, Thailand, placing in the top 20. At the pageant, she gave a speech criticizing the military rule in Myanmar.

== Activism ==
Han Lay is a supporter of the pro-democracy movement in Myanmar and has called Aung San Suu Kyi her "greatest inspiration". She participated in protests in Yangon against the 2021 Myanmar coup d'état. Following her speech at Miss Grand International 2020, Han Lay received numerous online threats.

Han Lay took refuge in Thailand in 2021, and in 2022 was reportedly denied re-entry into Thailand after visiting Vietnam. She reportedly spent one night in a detention room. She worked with the United Nations High Commissioner for Refugees (UNHCR) to seek political asylum in Canada. Han Lay received political asylum in Canada, arriving in Toronto in September 2022.

She now resides in Prince Edward Island, Canada.

Awards and achievements
Preceded by Hmwe Thet	Miss Grand Myanmar; 2020	Succeeded by Amara Shune Lei
