= Miss Grand Myanmar 2016 =

1st edition of the Miss Grand Myanmar competition

- Date: August 7, 2016
- Venue: City Hall of Pyin Oo Lwin, Mandalay Region
- Broadcaster: Sky Net Teen
- Entrants: 24
- Placements: 10
- Winner: Nandar Lwin (Yangon)

Miss Grand Myanmar 2016 was the first edition of the Miss Grand Myanmar beauty pageant, held at the City Hall of Pyin Oo Lwin, on August 8, 2016, by Yangon-based event organizer Style Plus H. Twenty-four candidates competed for the title, of whom a Yangon-based model, Nandar Lwin, was announced the winner. She was crowned by San Htate Htar Linn, Miss Grand Myanmar 2015 and later represented the country at the international competition, Miss Grand International 2016, held at the Westgate International Theater in Las Vegas, Nevada, United States on 25 October, but got non-placement.

In addition to the winner, the country representatives for Miss Tourism International 2016 and Miss Tourism Queen of the Year were also determined. The grand final of the pageant was broadcast live to the audience nationwide on Sky Net Teen Channel.

== Result ==
Miss Grand Myanmar 2016 competition result
Position	Delegate	International Placements
Miss Grand Myanmar 2016	South Yangon – Nandar Lwin	Unplaced — Miss Grand International 2016
Miss Tourism Myanmar 2016	Central Mandalay – Khay La Yaung	Unplaced — Miss Tourism International 2016
Miss Tourism Queen of the Year Myanmar 2016	North Yangon – Khin Injinn Kyaw	Unplaced — Miss Tourism Queen of the Year International 2016 (Best in Evening Wear)
1st runner-up	East Yangon – May Phuu Pwint Nwe	
2nd runner-up	South Shan State – Cherry Htun	
Special Award
Best Complexion	South Shan State – Cherry Htun	

== Contestants ==
24 contestants competed for the title.

No.	Representative	Region/State	Ref.
MGM01	Sabal Akari	Kayin State	
MGM02	Thae Thitsar Theint	Mandalay Region–North	
MGM03	Yati Oo	Sagaing Region–North	
MGM04	Nan Kyal Sin	Sagaing Region–South	
MGM05	Cherry Htun	Shan State–South	
MGM06	May Doez	Tanintharyi Region	
MGM07	Thinzar	Yangon East	
MGM08	Chue Pyae Eain Si	Shan State–East	
MGM09	Khay La Yaung	Mandalay Region–Central	
MGM10	May Phuu Pwint Nwe	Yangon East	
MGM11	Yamin Oo	Shan State–North	
MGM12	Thint Myat Noe	Yangon West	
MGM13	Nan Khin Lay	Mandalay Region–South	
MGM14	Chaw Kalayar Han	Kayah State	
MGM15	San Yati Htet	Mon State	
MGM16	Myat Su Mon Htay	Naypyidaw	
MGM17	Aye Kyi Pyar	Magway Region	
MGM18	Ni Ki	Rakhine State	
MGM19	Nan Satt	Kachin State	
MGM20	Nandar Lwin	Yangon South	
MGM21	Myat Thwe Khine	Yangon South	
MGM22	Barbie Lay	Chin State	
MGM23	May Yone Kyi	Yangon West	
MGM24	Khin Injinn Kyaw	Yangon North	
