= Htar Htet Htet =

Burmese actress and beauty queen

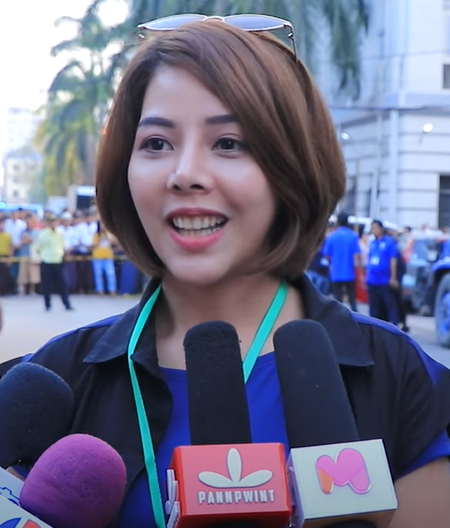
- Born: Htar Htet Htet; 19 December 1989 (age 36); Kalay, Myanmar
- Occupation: Actress
- Title: Miss Grand Myanmar 2013
- Parents: Dr.Kyaw Moe (father); Tin Tin Swe (mother)

Htar Htet Htet (Burmese: ထားထက်ထက်) is a Burmese actress and beauty pageant titleholder who represented Myanmar at the inaugural Miss Grand International beauty pageant in Thailand in 2013. She won the Miss Popular Award at the inaugural Miss Grand International 2013 beauty contest in Bangkok, Thailand.

== Early life and education ==
Htar Htet Htet was born on 19 December 1989 in the Kalay, Myanmar. Her father is Dr.Kyaw Moe and her mother is Tin Tin Swe. She is the youngest of four siblings.

== Pageantry ==
She represented Myanmar at Miss Grand International 2013 in Thailand. Competing against 80 contenders, she reached the top 20 and won the Miss Popular award.

== Career ==
Htar Htet Htet began her acting career in 2014, after competing in Miss Grand International 2013. Her acting debut was in the Burmese film Diary of a villain, where she played the leading role with Lu Min and Yone Lay. It was directed by Thar Nyi, and was released in Myanmar cinemas on 17 August 2018. However, due to the 2021 Myanmar coup d'état on 1 February, she fled from Yangoon in late April 2021 to start the military training with Karen National Defence Organisation (KNDO) as well as the United Defense Force (UDF) which was made up of protesters against the coup, and later joined the ethnic rebels in Myanmar's border regions to take up arms against the country's military leaders.

== Filmography ==
- Diary of a villain (2018)
- Special Force
- 25%
- Ayuu Taw Mingalar

Awards and achievements
Preceded by First Edition	Miss Grand Myanmar; 2013	Succeeded by M Ja Seng, Kachin State
