= Kangyi Pagoda =

Pagoda in Mudon, Myanmar

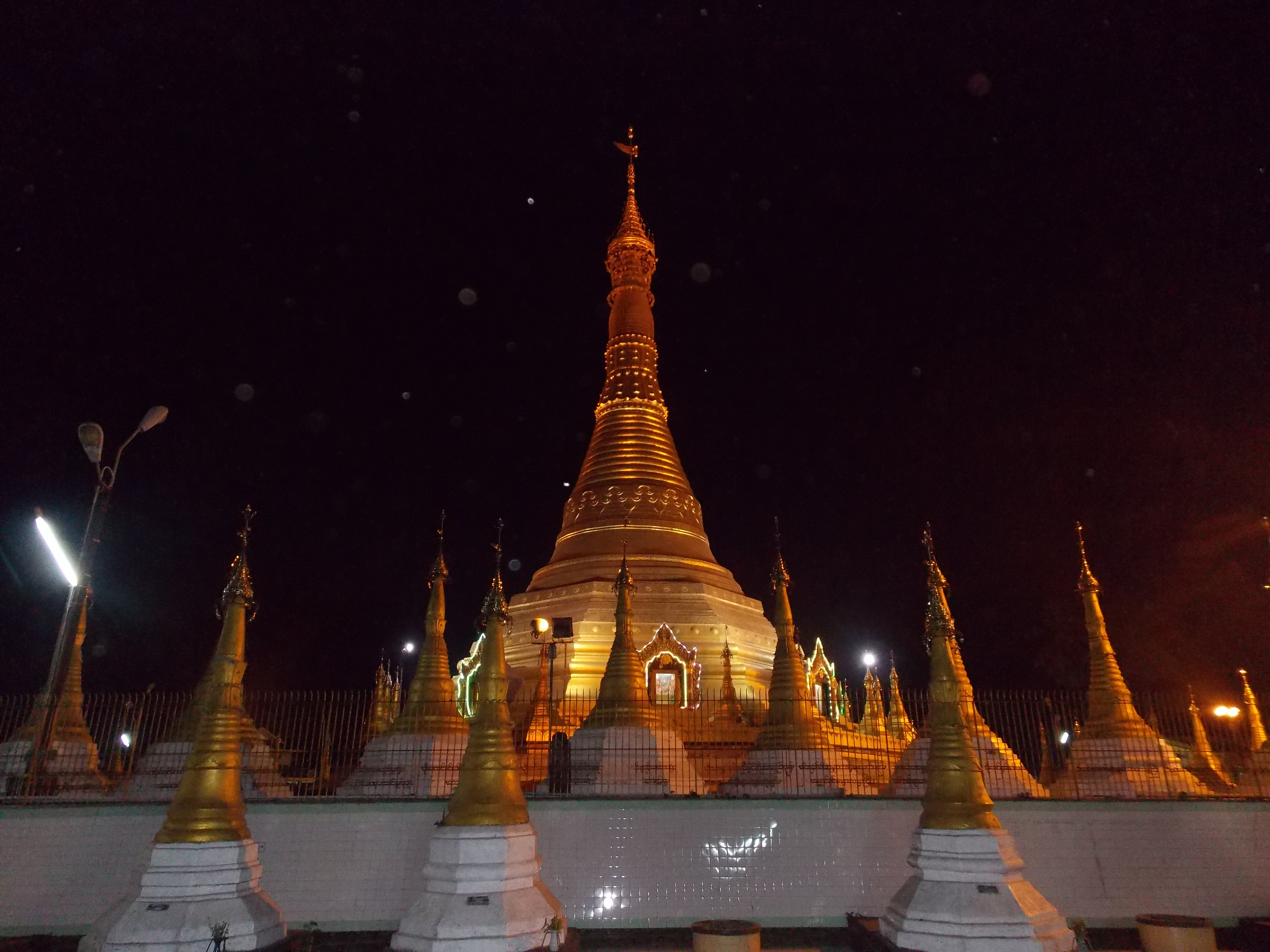

- Location within Myanmar

Religion
- Affiliation: Theravada Buddhism

Location
- Location: Mudon, Mon State
- Country: Myanmar
- Coordinates: 16.246802°N 97.732395°E

Architecture
- Founder: Siridhammasoka?

Kangyi Pagoda (Burmese: ကန်ကြီးစေတီတော်) is a Buddhist pagoda located on a hill west of the vast lake east of Mudon, in Mon State, Myanmar. It was built to enshrine a Buddha's hair relic granted by Buddha as he and five hundred arahantas were going on sojourn this way on completion of eight vasas to a hermit named (Min) Maung staying there. The original was built into a higher one 40 cubits high by town mayor of Zaya.

Banya Thampi. Shin Thawna and Shin Ottara. under the reign of Thiri Dhamma Thawka Yaza. in 239. It was further rebuilt to be 89 cubits high by the nationals in 1198. Now it is 98 cubits high. with an octagonal base and 418 cubits of plinth. in the middle of a walled compound 4.62 acres. On the upper terrace are 23 pagodas. with 50 on the middle terrace. 33 on the lower terrace and 18 on the precincts.
