= Amara Shune Lei =

Burmese model

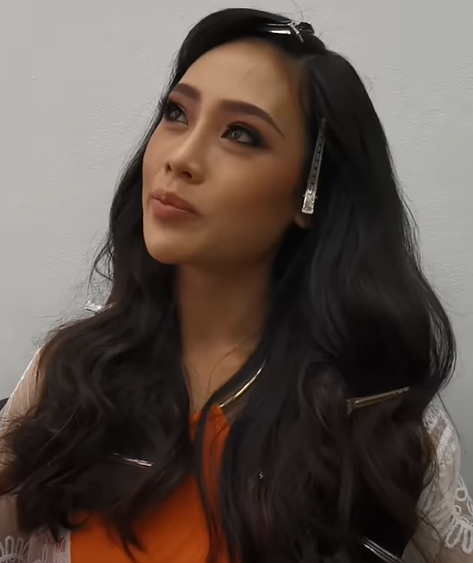
- Amara Shune Lei in 2021
- Born: Win Lei Lei Naing; Kengtung, Shan State, Myanmar
- Education: Business Management
- Height: 178 cm (5 ft 10 in)
- Beauty pageant titleholder
- Title: Miss Earth Myanmar 2020; Miss Grand Myanmar 2021
- Hair color: Dark Brown
- Eye color: Dark Brown
- Major competitions: Miss Sunkist 2019 (Winner); Miss Earth Myanmar 2020 (Winner); Miss Earth 2020 (Top 8); (gold) Beach Wear; (silver) Evening Gown; (silver) Sports Wear; (silver) Talent Competition (Creative); (bronze) Best National Costume; Miss Grand Myanmar 2021 (Winner); Miss Grand International 2021 (Top 20)

Amara Shune Lei is a Burmese model and beauty pageant titleholder who was crowned as Miss Earth Myanmar 2020. She represented the Myanmar at the Miss Earth 2020 pageant and finally she was placed in Top 8.

She was crowned Miss Grand Myanmar 2021. She competed at Miss Grand International 2021 in Bangkok, Thailand on 4 December 2021, placing in the top 20. She is the first Burmese Beauty Queen who got placement twice in Major and other Beauty Pageants (Miss Grand International and Miss Earth).

== Pageantry ==
=== Miss Sunkist 2019 ===
Amara competed in the Miss Sunkist Myanmar 2019 pageant which was held on October 9 and 10 in Junction City, Yangon. At the end of the event, she was crowned as Miss Sunkist 2019.

=== Miss Earth Myanmar 2020 ===
Amara Shune Lei, representing Yangon East, was crowned Miss Earth Myanmar 2020 which was held on 2020 August 31. She succeeds Miss Earth Myanmar 2019, May Thadar Ko for the title.

=== Miss Earth 2020 ===
Amara competed in the Miss Earth 2020 pageant which was held virtually. The pageant preliminary was streamed online on virtual channel KTX on 24 November 2020. She was placed in the top 8.

- Special Awards:
  - (gold) Beach Wear
  - (silver) Evening Gown
  - (silver) Sports Wear
  - (silver) Talent Competition (Creative)
  - (bronze) Best National Costume

=== Miss Grand Myanmar 2021 ===
Amara was appointed as Miss Grand Myanmar 2021 by National Director of Miss Grand Myanmar.

=== Miss Grand International 2021 ===
Miss Grand Myanmar 2021, Amara Shune Lei represented Myanmar at the Miss Grand International 2021 pageant which was held in Bangkok, Thailand in December 2021. At the end of the event, she was placed in the top 20.

Awards and achievements
Preceded by May Thandar Ko	Miss Earth Myanmar; 2020	Succeeded by Lin Htet Htet Kyaw
Preceded by Han Lay	Miss Grand Myanmar; 2021	Succeeded by Ei Ei Aung Htut
