= Hakha Township =

Township in Chinland, Myanmar (Burma)

Coordinates: 22.6333°N 93.6000°E

Hakha Township ဟားခါးမြို့နယ်
- Township
- Location in Hakha district (in red)
- Country: Burma
- State: Chinland
- District: Hakha District

Area
  - Total: 1,608.2 sq mi (4,165.3 km^{2})

Population (2024)
  - Total: 63,123
  - Density: 39.250/sq mi (15.154/km^{2})
- Time zone: UTC+6:30 (MST)

Hakha Township (Burmese: ဟားခါးမြို့နယ်) is a township of Hakha District in the Chin State of Burma. It surrounds the city of Hakha, the state capital. It became part of Falam District until Hakha District was formed by the first Chin State Hluttaw emergency meeting No. 2/2012 on 1 June 2012.

== Settlements ==
- Buanlung
- Za Thal
- Dawngva
- Surkhua
- Sakta
- Loklung
- Vanmualthar
- Khuapi
- Lungrang
- Lungtar
- Phaizawng(Lungthin Pi)
- Phaipha
- Lungkhin
- Lunghau
- Bungzung
- Leium
- Bongtuah
- Dumvaa
- Tilak
- Hausen
- Keizuan
- Dinlaupa hausen
- Maukhua

== Demographics ==
Historical Population
Year	Pop.	±%
1973		—
1983		—
2014	48,352	—
Source: Ministry of Labor, Immigration, and Population data

The 2024 Myanmar census reported that Hakha Township had a population of 63,123, up from 48,352 in 2014. The population density was 11.6 people per km^{2}. The census reported that the median age was 23.2 years, and there were 91 males per 100 females. The 9,917 households had a mean household size of 4.7.
