= Kyaikto =

Kyaikto ကျိုက်ထို ကျာ်ထဝ်
- Town
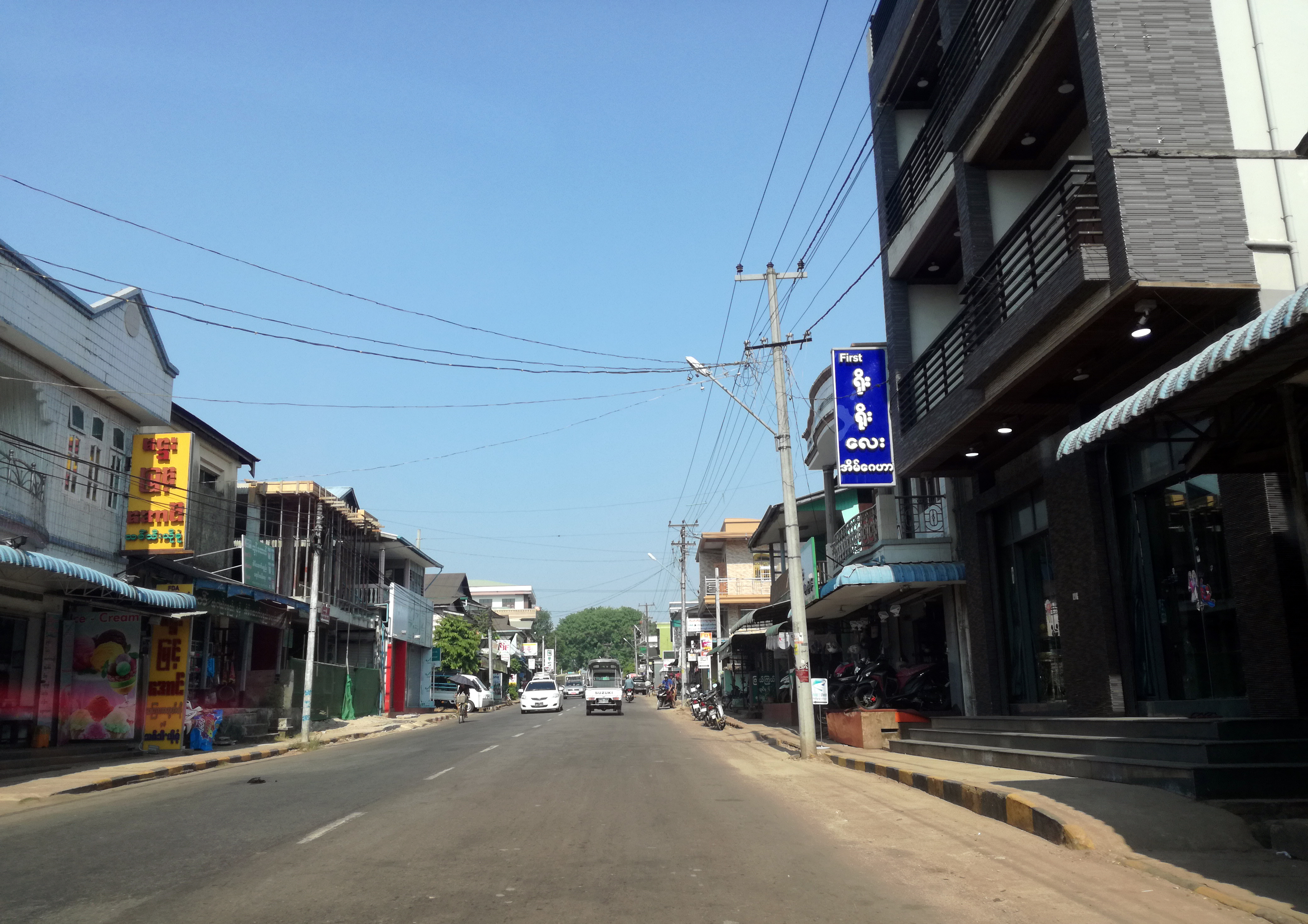

- Location in Myanmar
- Coordinates: 17°18′0″N 97°1′37″E
- Country: Myanmar
- State: Mon State
- District: Kyaikto District
- Township: Kyaikto Township

Population (2005)
  - Religions: Buddhism
- Time zone: UTC+6.30 (MST)

Kyaikto (Burmese: ကျိုက်ထိုမြို့; Mon: ကျာ်ထဝ်) is the capital of Kyaikto District in the Mon State of south-east Myanmar. It is part of the Kyaikto Township, which was part of Thaton District prior to 2022. It is the nearest town to the Kyaiktiyo Pagoda (or the Golden Rock), a famous landmark in Myanmar.
