= Kyaikto District =

District in Mon State, Myanmar

Kyaikto District ကျိုက်ထိုခရိုင်
- Kyaikto District (Red) in Mon State
- Coordinates: 17.302°N 97.197°E
- Country: Myanmar
- Region: Mon State
- Capital: Kyaikto
- Time zone: MMT

Kyaikto District (Burmese: ကျိုက်ထိုခရိုင်) is a district in northern Mon State, Myanmar. It was split from Thaton District on 30 April 2022 and contains two townships. Its district seat is Kyaikto.

== Townships ==
Townships in Kyaikto District:

- Kyaikto Township
- Bilin Township
