= Miss Teen International =

Miss Teen International may refer to:

- Miss Teen International (Americas), owned and operated by Rodrigo Moreira
- Miss Teen International (India), owned and operated by Nikhil Anand
