= Thaton Township =

Coordinates: 16.9333°N 97.3667°E

Thaton Township သထုံမြို့နယ်
- Township
- Location in Thaton district
- Country: Myanmar
- State: Mon State
- District: Thaton District
- Time zone: UTC+6:30 (MST)

Thaton Township (Burmese: သထုံမြို့နယ်) is a township of Thaton District in the Mon State of Myanmar. It is the home of Thaton Institute of Agriculture. The capital is Thaton.
