= Paung Township =

Coordinates: 16.6167°N 97.4500°E

ပေါင်မြို့နယ် ပွိုၚ်ဍုၚ်ပံၚ်
- Township
- Paung Township
- Location in Thaton district
- Country: Myanmar
- State: Mon State
- District: Thaton District
- Time zone: UTC+6:30 (MMT)

Paung Township (Burmese: ပေါင်မြို့နယ်; Mon: ပွိုၚ်ဍုၚ်ပံၚ်) is a township of Thaton District in the Mon State of Myanmar.

== Population ==
In the 1983 census, the population of Paung was recorded at 196,194. In the 2014 census the population had increased to 218,459. In the 2024 census, the population had declined to 184,040 people.
