= Kyaikto Township =

Coordinates: 17.3000°N 97.0333°E

Kyaikto Township ကျိုက်ထိုမြို့နယ်
- Township
- Location in Kyaikto district
- Country: Myanmar
- State: Mon State
- District: Kyaikto District
- Time zone: UTC+6:30 (MMT)

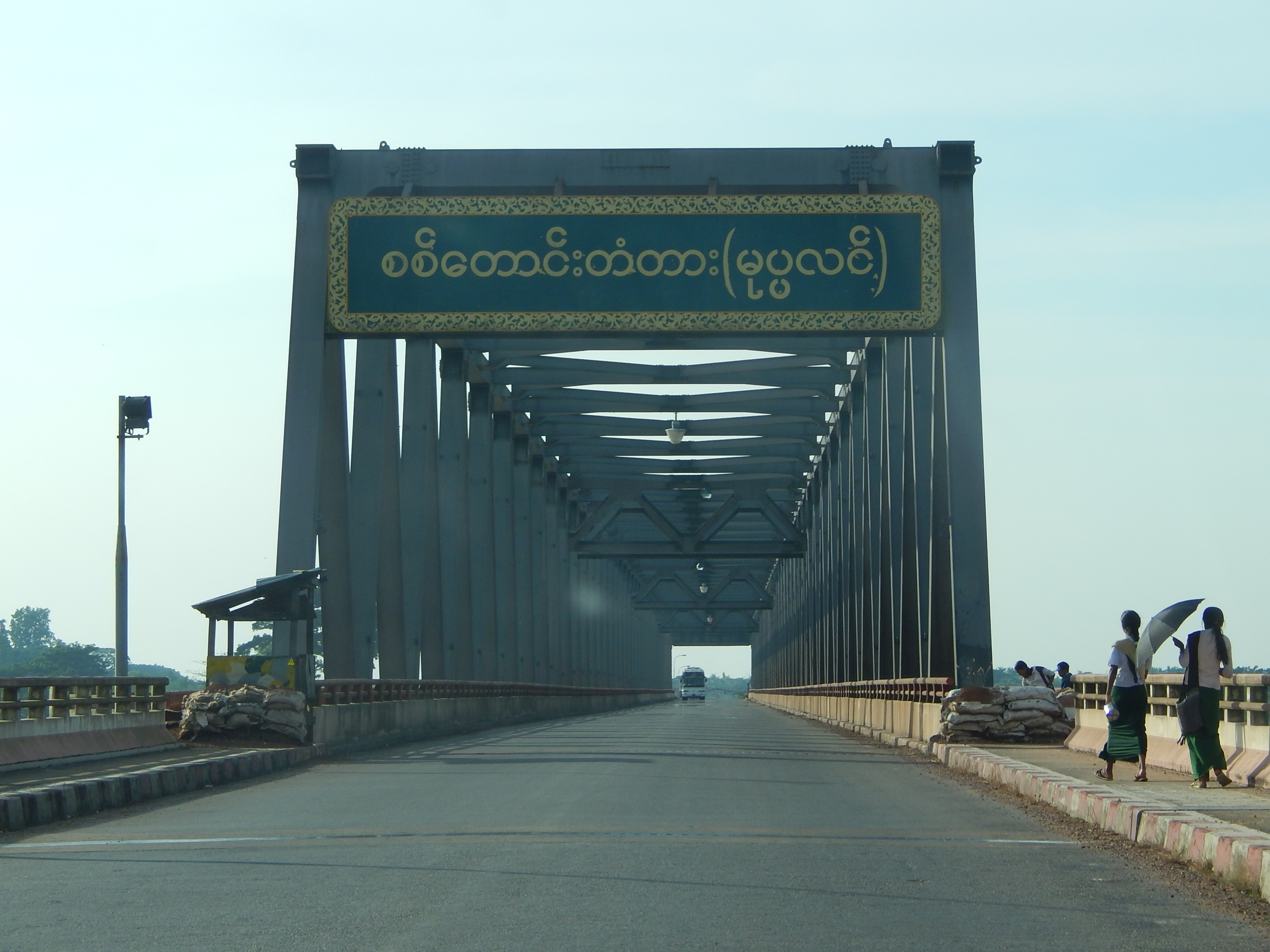
Bridge over the Sittaung at Moppalin

Kyaikto Township (Burmese: ကျိုက်ထိုမြို့နယ်) is a township of Kyaikto District in the Mon State of Myanmar. Its principal town is Kyaikto.

There were 157,216 persons with 27,745 households in Kyaikto Township according to an answer at Myanmar Parliament in September 2011. And there were one 25-bed township hospital, one 16-bed Theinzayat Station Hospital, one maternal and child healthcare centre, seven rural healthcare centres, and 28 rural healthcare branches.

== Transport ==
Theinzayat Railway Station is the main train station that serves the township Kyaikto township.
