= Mudon =

Mudon မုဒုံမြို့ မုဟ်ဍုၚ်
- Town
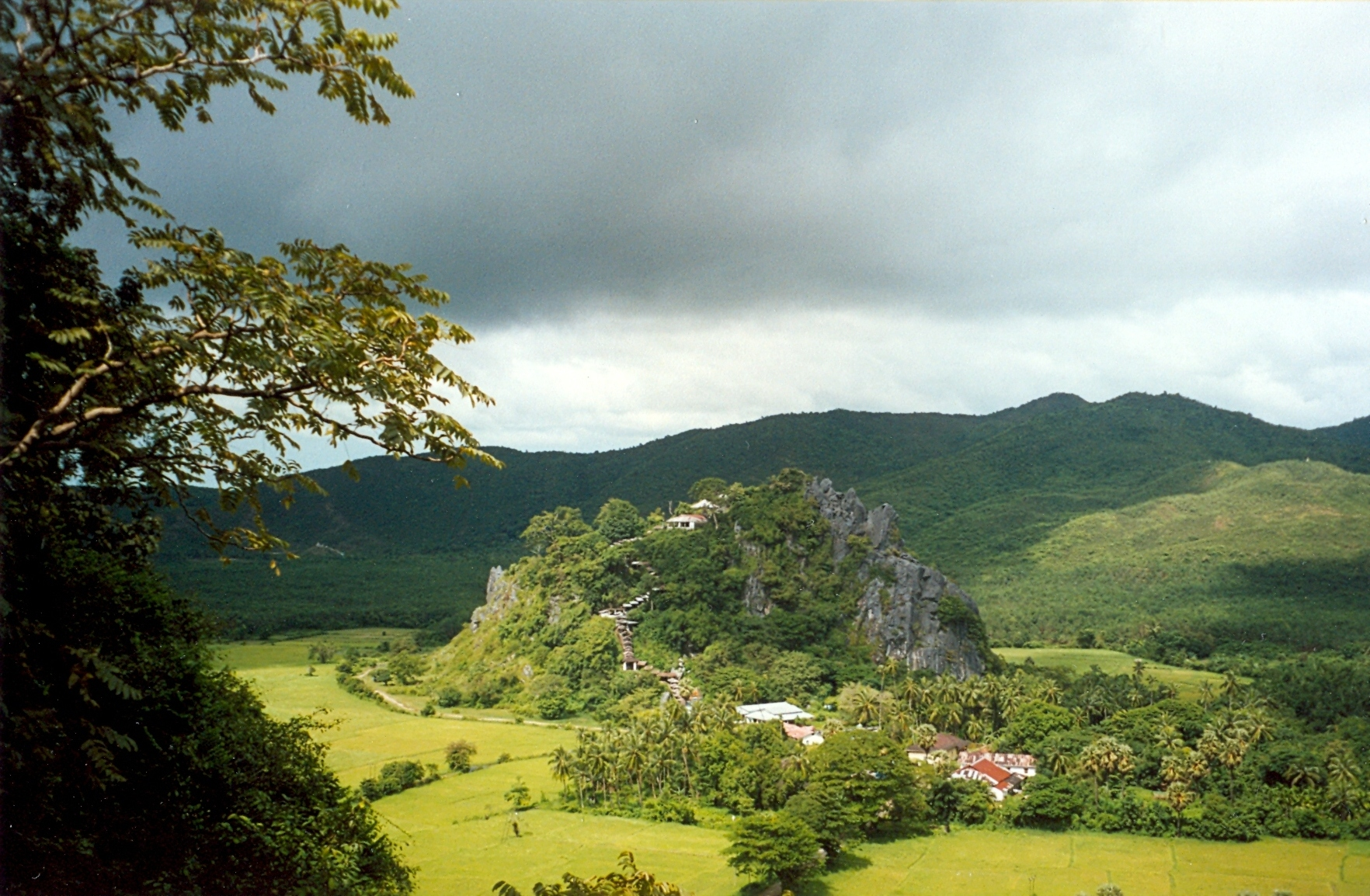
- Limestone landscape in the western foothills of the Dawna Range near Mudon, Mon State

- Location in Burma
- Coordinates: 16°15′28″N 97°42′59″E
- Country: Myanmar
- Division: Mon State

Population (2005)
  - Religions: Buddhism
- Time zone: UTC+6.30 (MST)
- Area code: 57

Mudon (Burmese: မုဒုံမြို့; Mon: မုဟ်ဍုၚ်) is a town in the Mon State of south-east Myanmar, 29 kilometres (18 mi) south of Mawlamyine. Mudon lies along the highway that links Mawlamyine to Thanbyuzayat, Kyaik-kami (Amherst) and Setse Beach.

== Etymology ==
"Mudon" derives from the Mon language term Mudeung (Mon: မုဟ်ဍုၚ်; /mùh dɜŋ/), which means "salty peak."

== Attractions ==
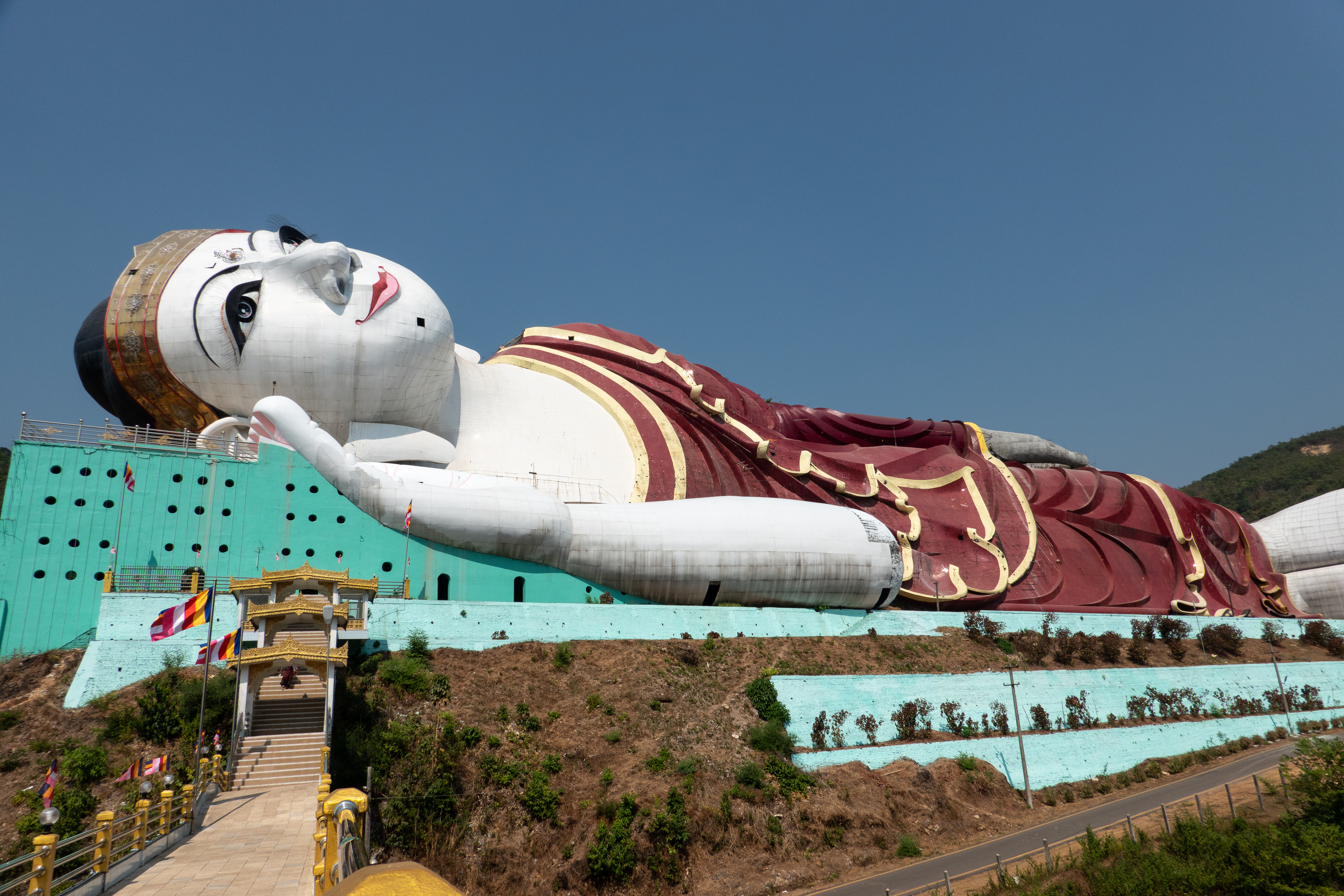
Win Sein Taw Ya

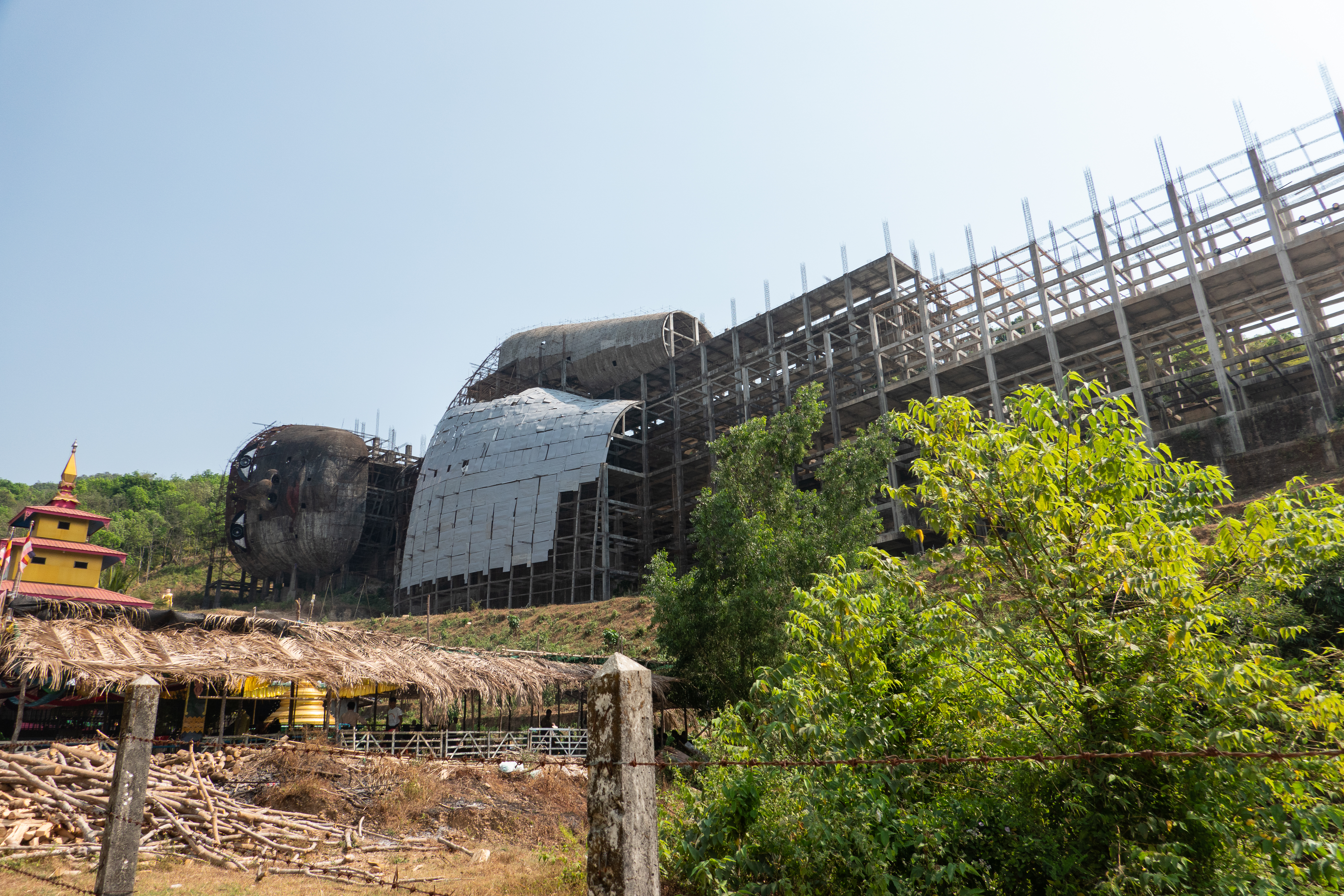
New reclining Buddha under construction (in 2020)

The Win Sein reclining Buddha, the world's largest reclining Buddha, is a major attraction in Mudon. It is approached by a roadway with 500 life-size statues of Arahant disciples of Buddha. The statue is 180 metres (590 ft) in length, and 30 metres (98 ft) in height. Inside there are numerous rooms with dioramas of the teachings of Buddhism, similar to Haw Par Villa of Singapore.

As of 2020, a second reclining Buddha of comparable size is under construction.

Other attractions are Kangyi Pagoda, Kangyi Lake, Jon Jon Ja Forest Monastery, Mon culture at Kamawet village and the Kyauktalon Taung and Yadana Taung limestone formations.

== Tradition ==
Local women are famous for weaving red-checked pattern longyis with traditional wooden loom.

== Gallery ==
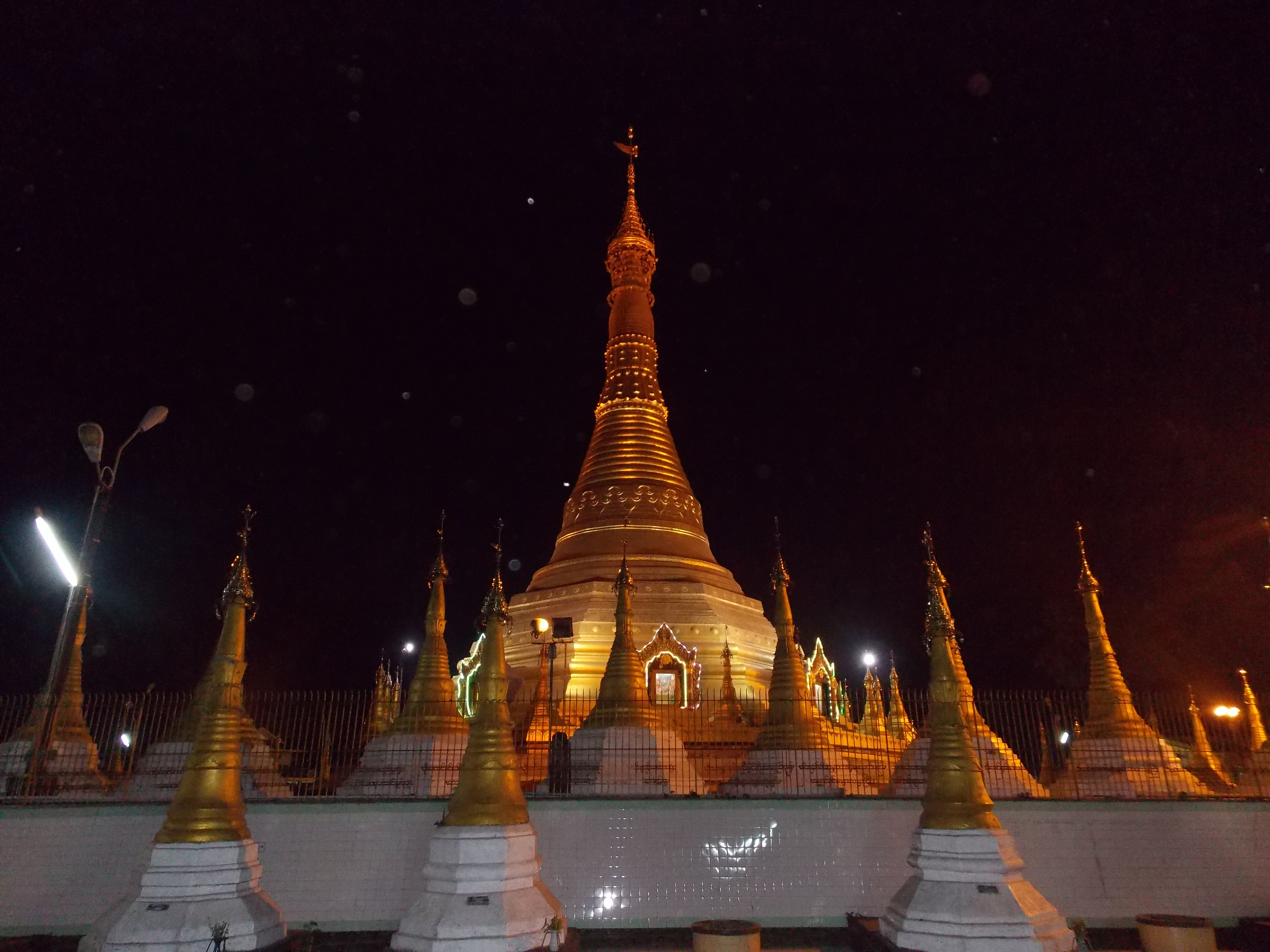
Kangyi Pagoda

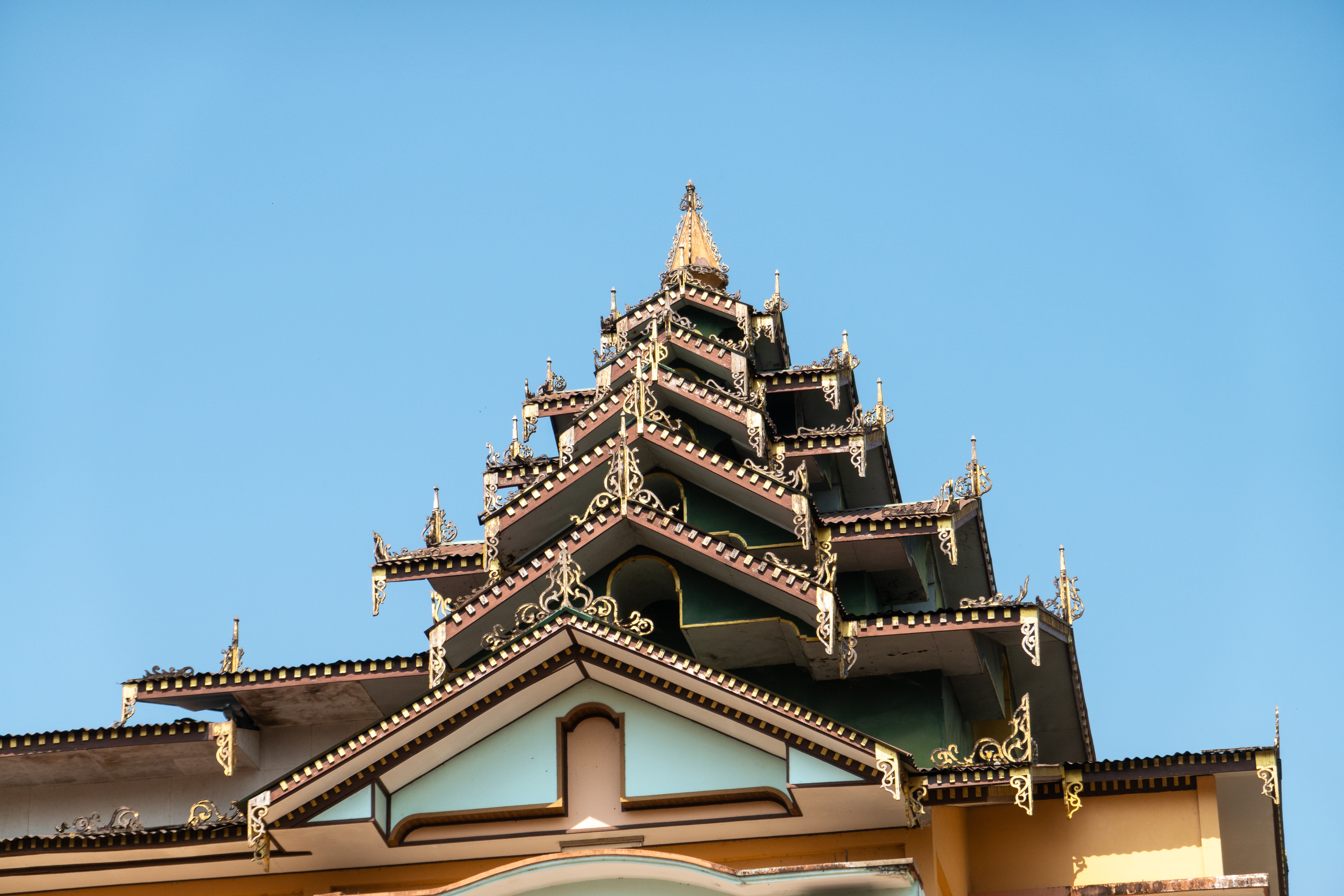
Kangyi Pagoda

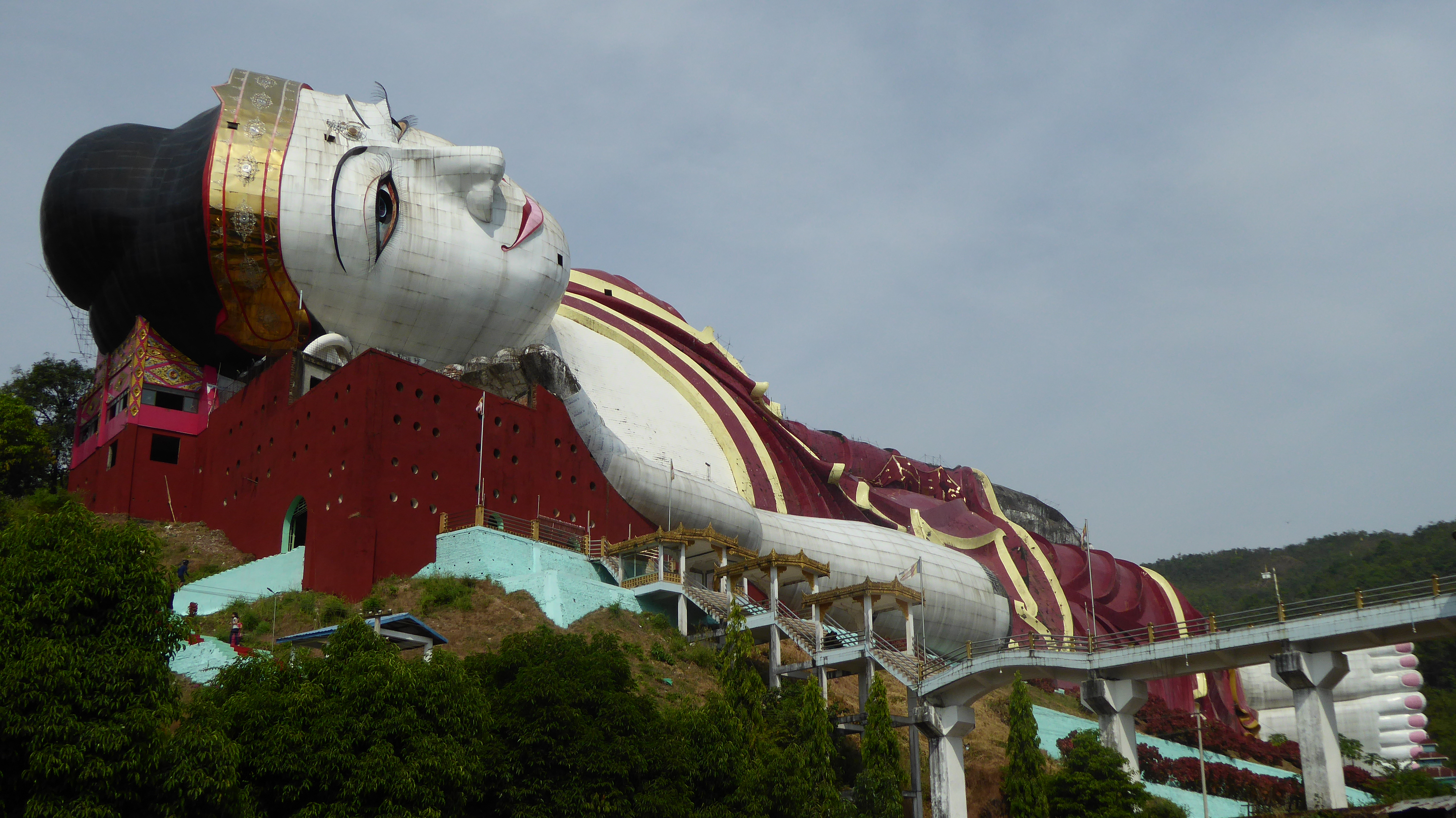
Win Sein Taw Ya - reclining Buddha

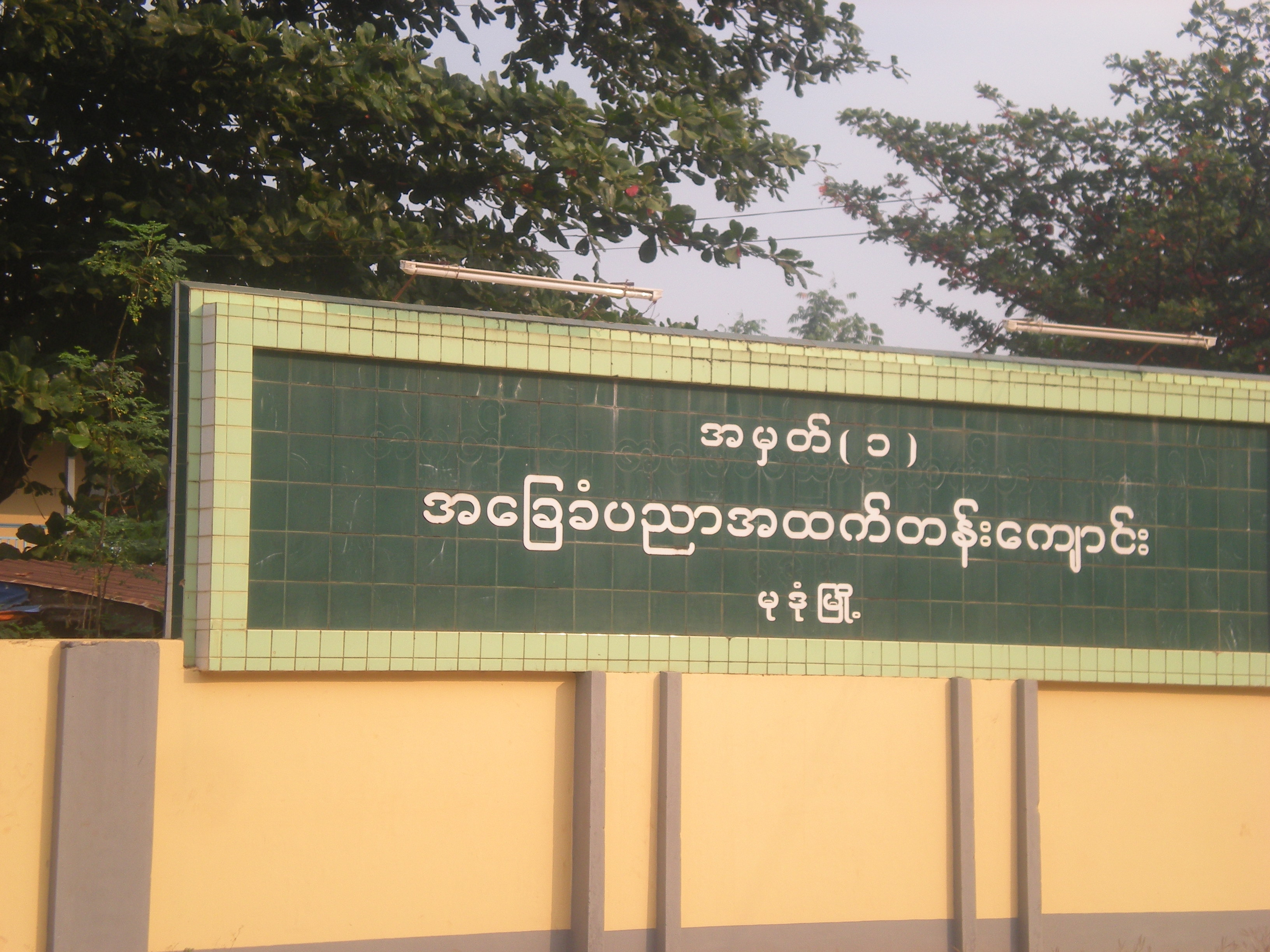
Mudon High School

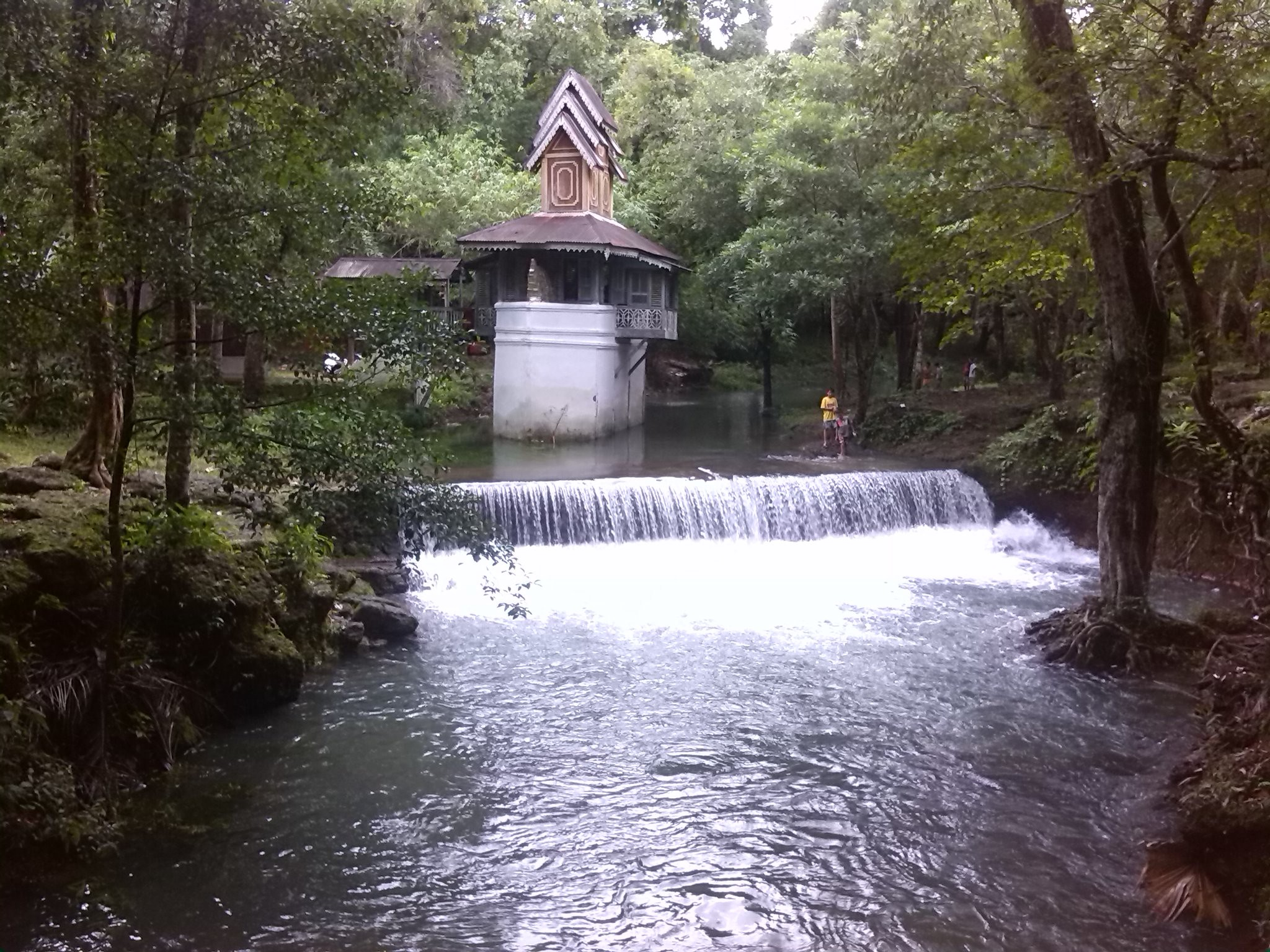
Jon Jon Ja Forest monastery waterfall

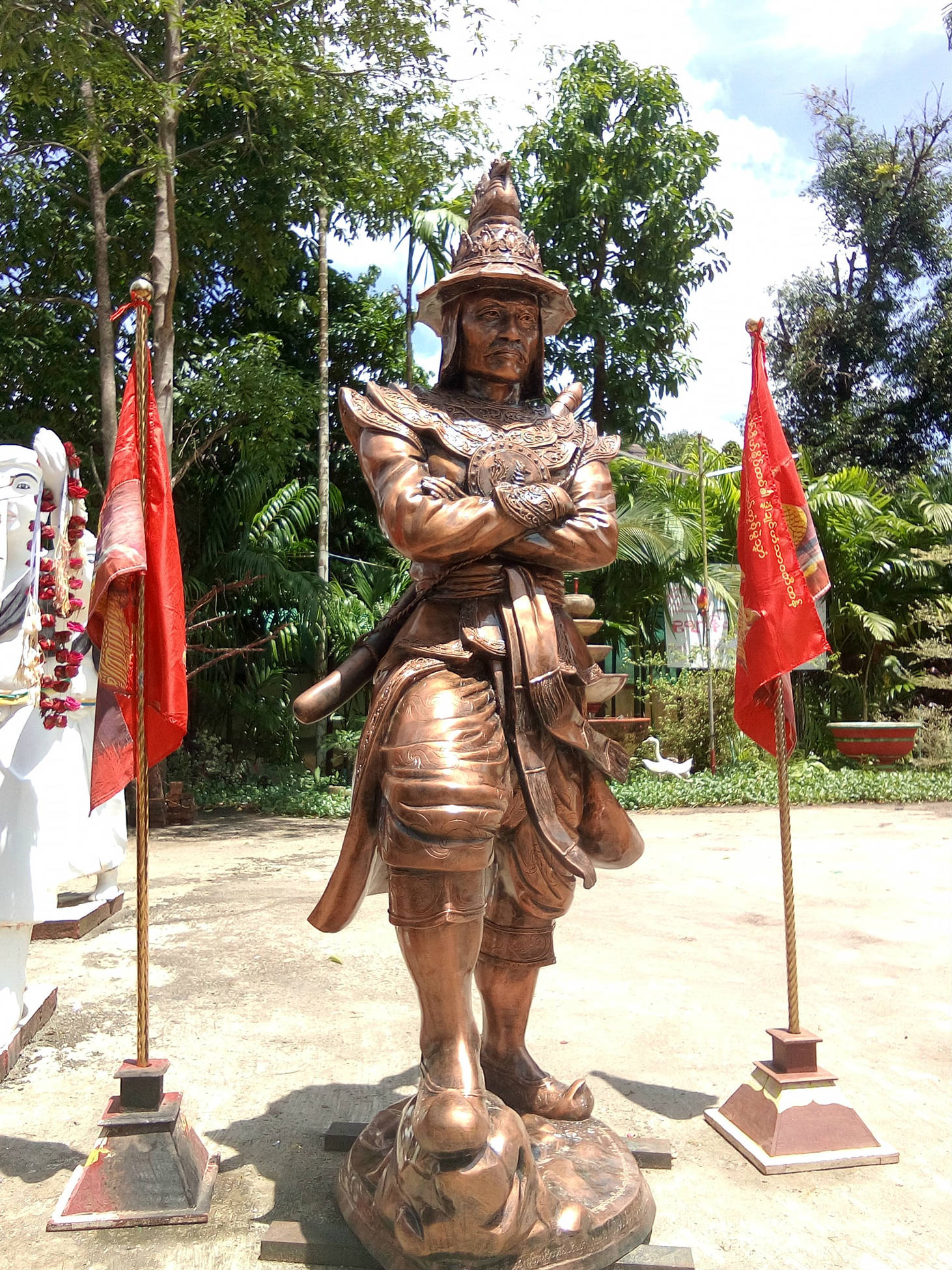
Statue of Razadarit at Kamawet Village

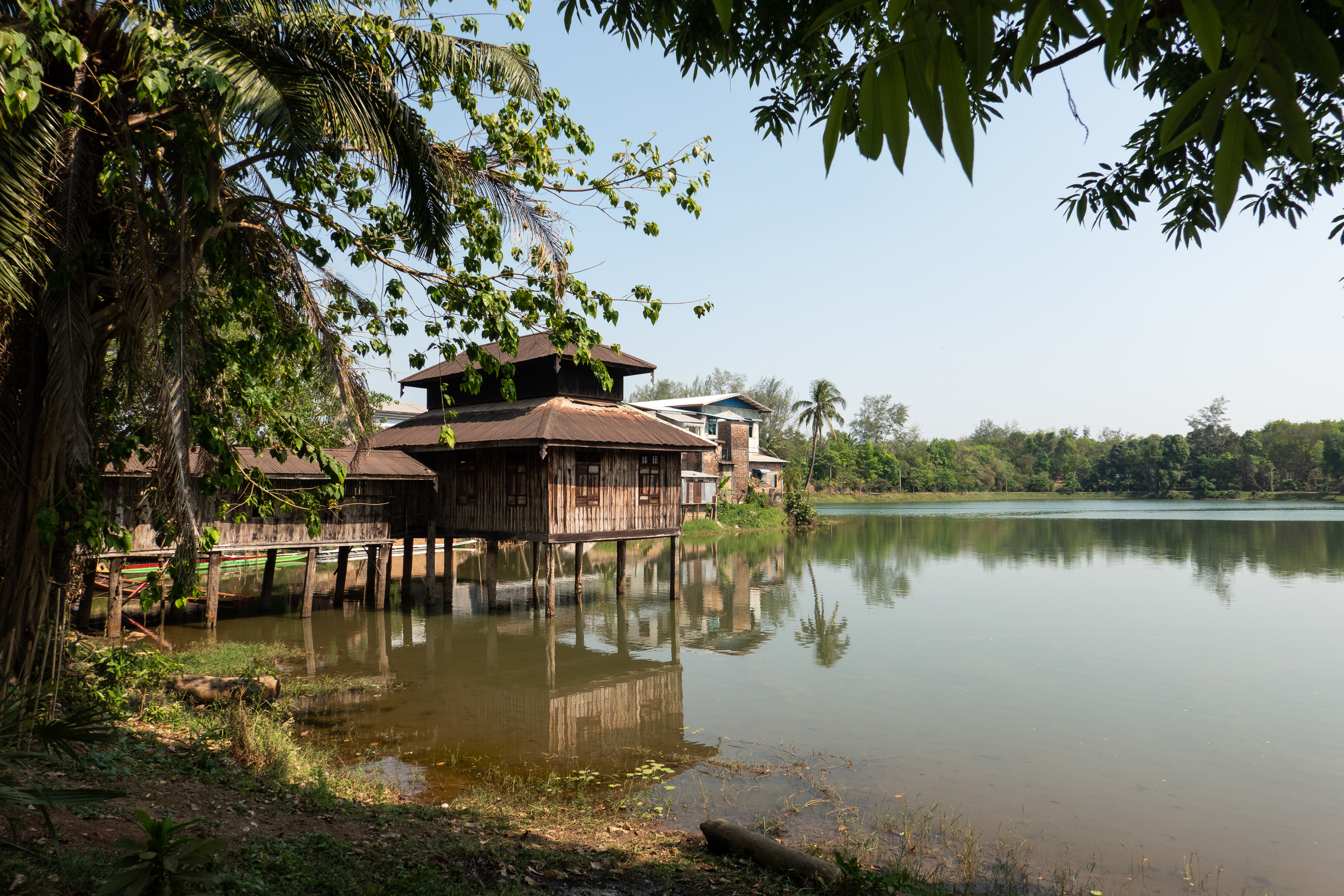
Kangyi Lake

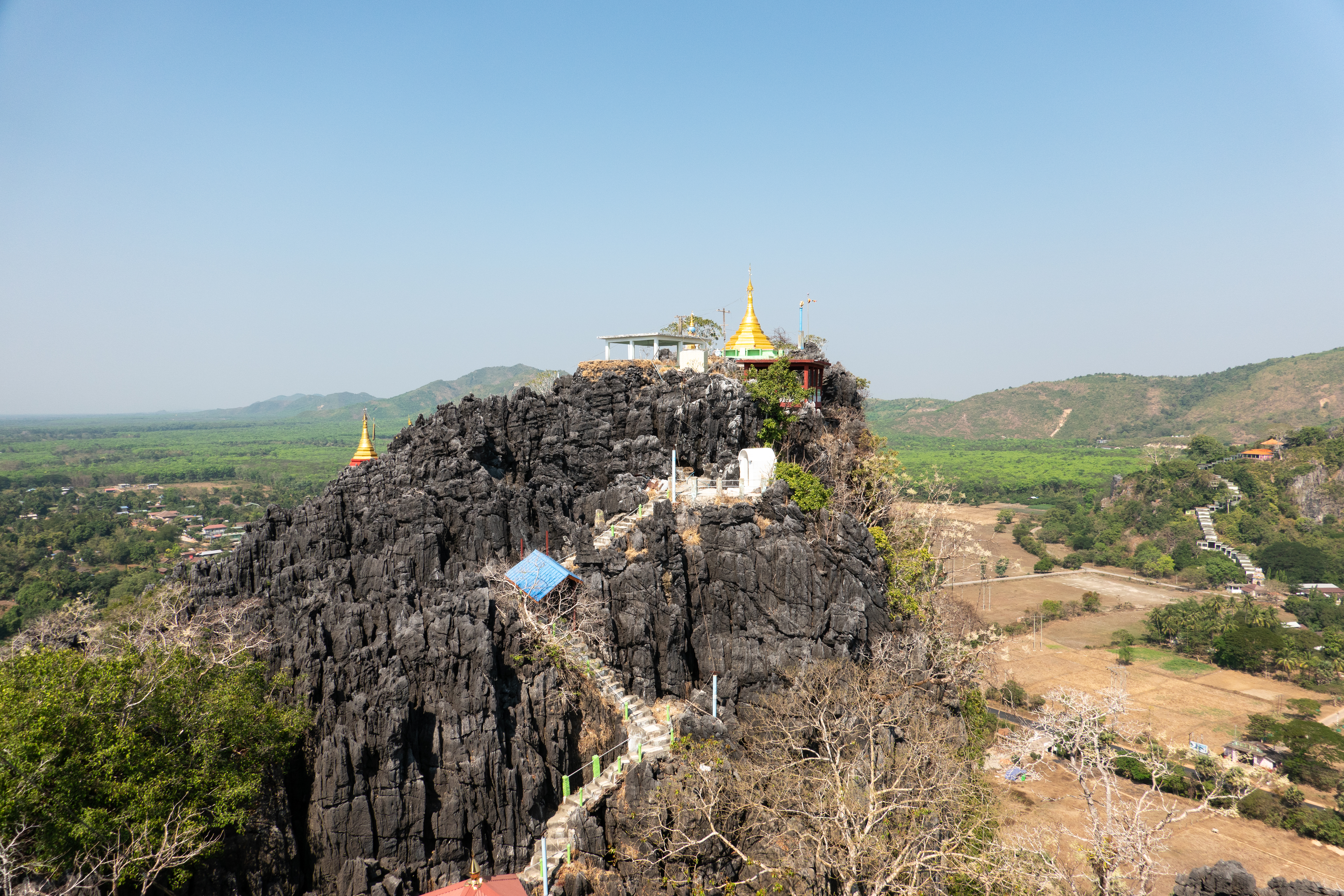
Kyauktalon Taung
