= Thaton District =

Coordinates: 17°00′N 97°30′E

Thaton District (Burmese: သထုံခရိုင်; Mon: ခရီုသဓီု; Karen: Doo The Htoo; Pa-O: သထွုံႏခရဲင်ႏ; is a district of the Mon State in Myanmar. The capital is Thaton town. The district covers an area of 5,157 km^{2}, and had a population of 822,172 at the 2014 Census.

location in Mon state (in red)

== Townships ==
The district contains the following townships:

- Thaton Township (pop. 238,106; area 1,236 km^{2})
- Paung Township (pop. 218,459; area 974 km^{2})

In 2022, the district was split up to form the new Kyaikto District. Prior to this, the district also included Kyaikto Township and Bilin Township.
