= Hakha District =

Coordinates: 22.6333°N 93.6000°E

Hakha District is the third district of the Chin State, Union of Myanmar. It was formed in the first Chin State Hluttaw emergency meeting No. 2/2012 on 1 June 2012. It consists of

- Hakha Township and
- Thantlang Township.

Location in Chin state
