= List of botanical gardens =

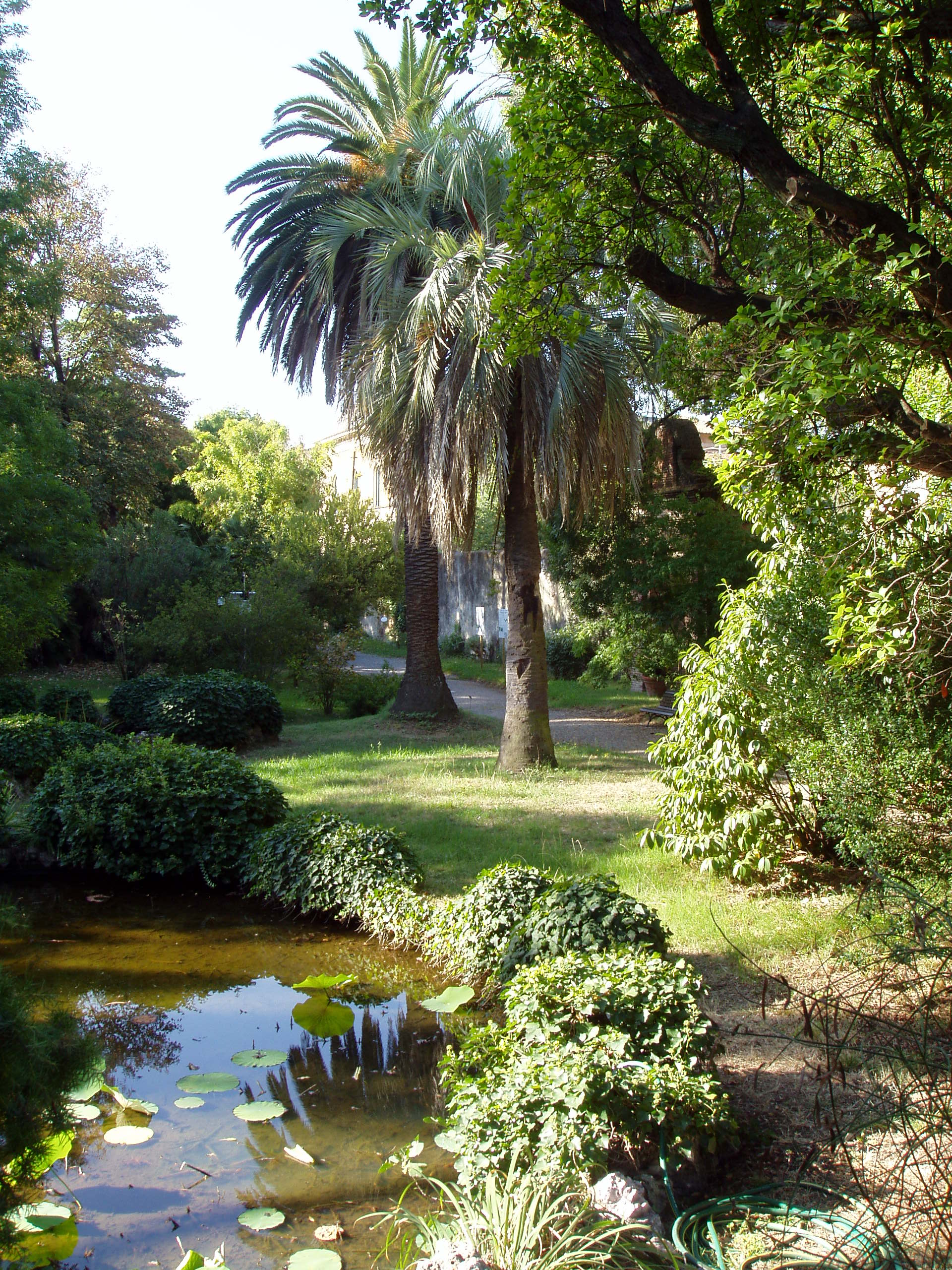
Orto botanico di Pisa at the University of Pisa is one of the earliest botanical gardens.

A botanical garden is a place where plants, especially ferns, conifers and flowering plants, are grown and displayed for the purposes of research, conservation, and education. This distinguishes them from parks and pleasure gardens where plants, usually with showy flowers, are grown for public amenity only. Botanical gardens that specialize in trees are sometimes referred to as arboretums. They are occasionally associated with zoos.

The earliest botanical gardens were founded in the late Renaissance at the University of Pisa (1543) and the University of Padua (1545) in Italy, for the study and teaching of medical botany. Many universities today have botanical gardens for student teaching and academic research, e.g. the Arnold Arboretum, Harvard University, US, the Bonn University Botanic Garden, Bonn, Germany, the Cambridge University Botanic Garden, Cambridge, England, the Hortus Botanicus, Leiden, Netherlands, and the Kraus Preserve of Ohio Wesleyan University, US.

This page lists important botanical gardens throughout the world. A useful database cataloging the world's botanic gardens can also be found at the Botanic Gardens Conservation International (BGCI) website. With over 800 participating botanical gardens, BGCI forms the world's largest network for plant conservation and environmental education.

== Barbados ==
- Andromeda Botanic Gardens
- Hunte's Gardens

== Belarus ==
- Central Botanical Garden of NAS of Belarus

== Belize ==
- Belize Botanic Gardens

== Bermuda ==
- Bermuda Botanical Gardens

== Botswana ==
- National Botanical Garden (Botswana), Gaborone

== Burkina Faso ==
- Bantia Botanical Garden

== Cameroon ==
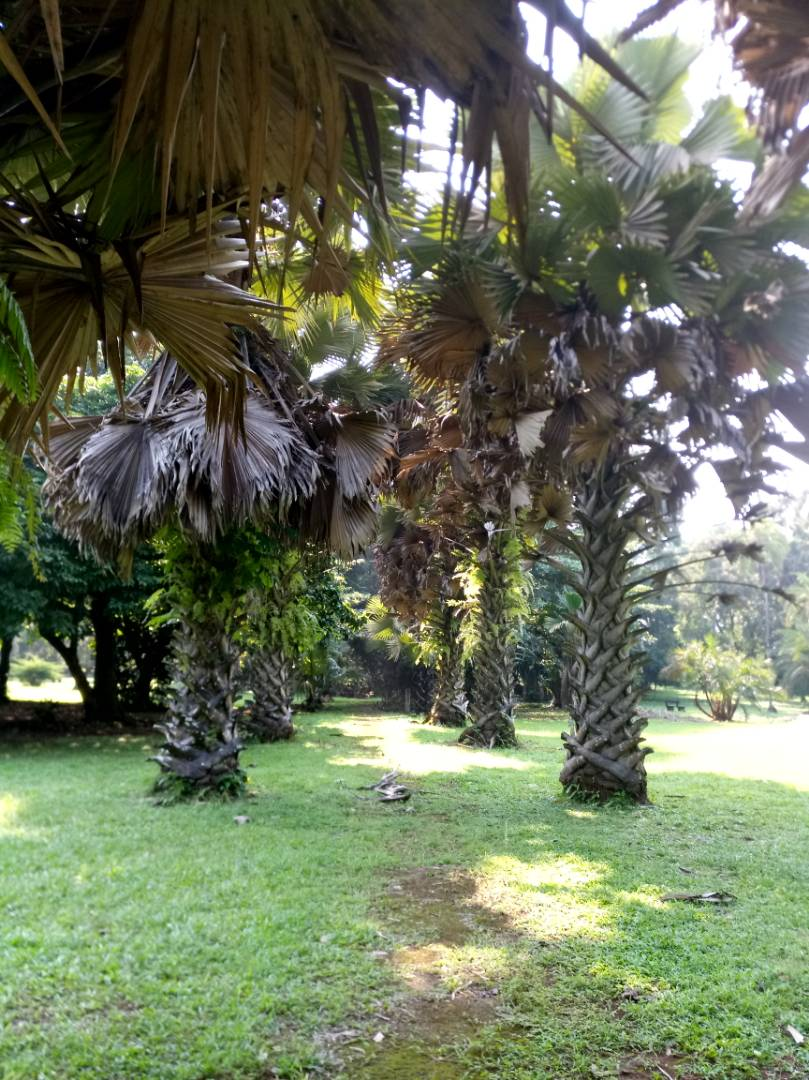
- The African Fan Palms in Limbe Botanical Gardens, Cameroon
  Limbe Botanic Garden

== Cayman Islands ==
- Queen Elizabeth II Botanic Park

== Costa Rica ==
- Lankester Botanical Garden

== Dominica ==
- Dominica Botanical Gardens

== Dominican Republic ==
- Dr. Rafael Ma. Moscoso National Botanical Garden

== Fiji ==
- Savurua Botanical Gardens
- Thurston Gardens, Suva

== Gibraltar ==
- Gibraltar Botanic Gardens

== Guyana ==
- Georgetown Botanical Gardens

== Haiti ==
- Jardin Botanique des Cayes

== Kuwait ==
- Bayan Botanical Garden, Bayan Palace

== Lebanon ==
- American University of Beirut (AUB) Botanic Garden

== Malta ==
- Argotti Botanic Gardens, Floriana

== Myanmar ==
- National Kandawgyi Botanical Gardens

== Monaco ==
- Jardin Exotique de Monaco

== Mongolia ==
- Misheel Botanical Garden

== Kyrgyzstan ==
- Botanical garden named after E. Gareev of Kyrgyzstan Science Academy, Bishkek

== Myanmar ==
- National Botanical Gardens, Pyin U Lwin, Mandalay Division

== North Korea ==
- Korea Central Botanical Garden, Pyongyang

== Pakistan ==
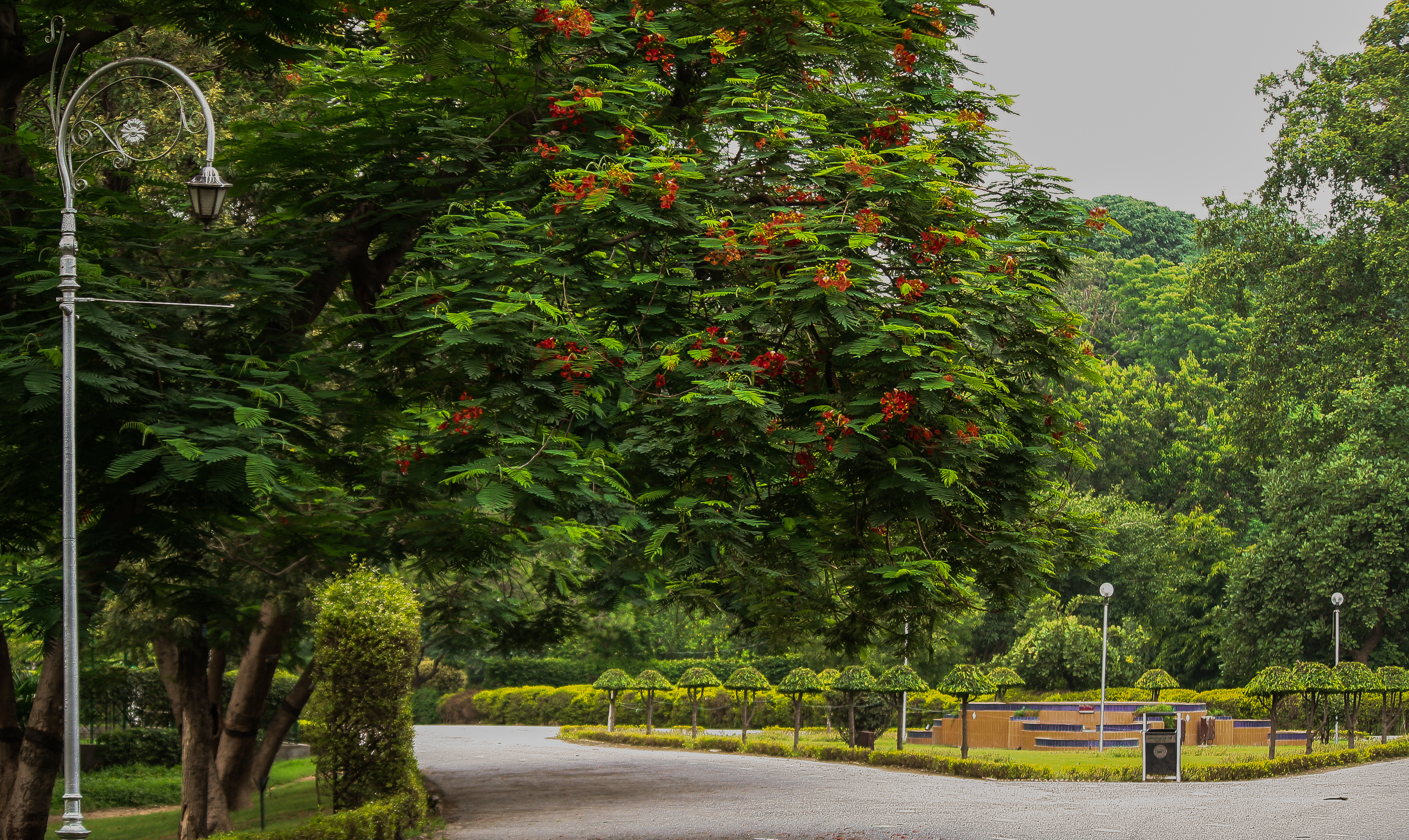

- Bagh-e-Jinnah, Lahore
- National Herbarium, Islamabad
- Rani Bagh Arboretum, Hyderabad
- Sukh Chayn Gardens, Lahore
- Herbarium and Botanical Garden, Shah Abdul Latif University

== Palestine ==
- Palestine Museum of Natural History - Botanic Garden

== Panama ==
- Parque Municipal Summit

== Paraguay ==
- Botanical Garden and Zoo of Asunción, Asunción

== Puerto Rico ==
- San Juan Botanical Garden

== Republic of Moldova ==
- Chișinău Botanical Garden

== Saint Lucia ==
- St. Lucia Botanical Gardens

== Saint Vincent and the Grenadines ==
- Saint Vincent and the Grenadines Botanic Gardens

== Serbia ==
- Botanical Garden Jevremovac, Belgrade

== Singapore ==
- Singapore Botanic Gardens

== Slovenia ==
- University Botanic Gardens, Ljubljana

== Sultanate Of Oman ==
- Oman Botanic Garden

== Sudan ==
- Sudan National Botanical Garden

== Sweden ==
- Alnarpsparken, Alnarp
- Bergius Botanic Garden, Stockholm
- Fredriksdal Museums and Gardens, Helsingborg
- Göteborg Botanical Garden, Gothenburg
- The Knowledge Garden at the Swedish University of Agricultural Sciences, Uppsala
- The Linnaean Gardens, Uppsala
- Lund Botanical Garden, Lund
- Visby Botanical Garden, Visby

== Tahiti ==
- Jardin Botanique, Papeete

== Tonga ==
- 'Ene'io Botanical Garden – Vava'u

== Turkey ==
- Atatürk Arboretum
- Karaca Arboretum

== Uganda ==
- National Botanical Gardens (Uganda)

== Venezuela ==
- Centro Jardín Botánico de Mérida

== See also ==
- List of herbaria
- List of aquaria
- List of zoos
- List of tourist attractions worldwide
