= Luis Vallejo Bonsai Museum =

Public access museum in Madrid, Spain

- Museo Bonsái Luis Vallejo
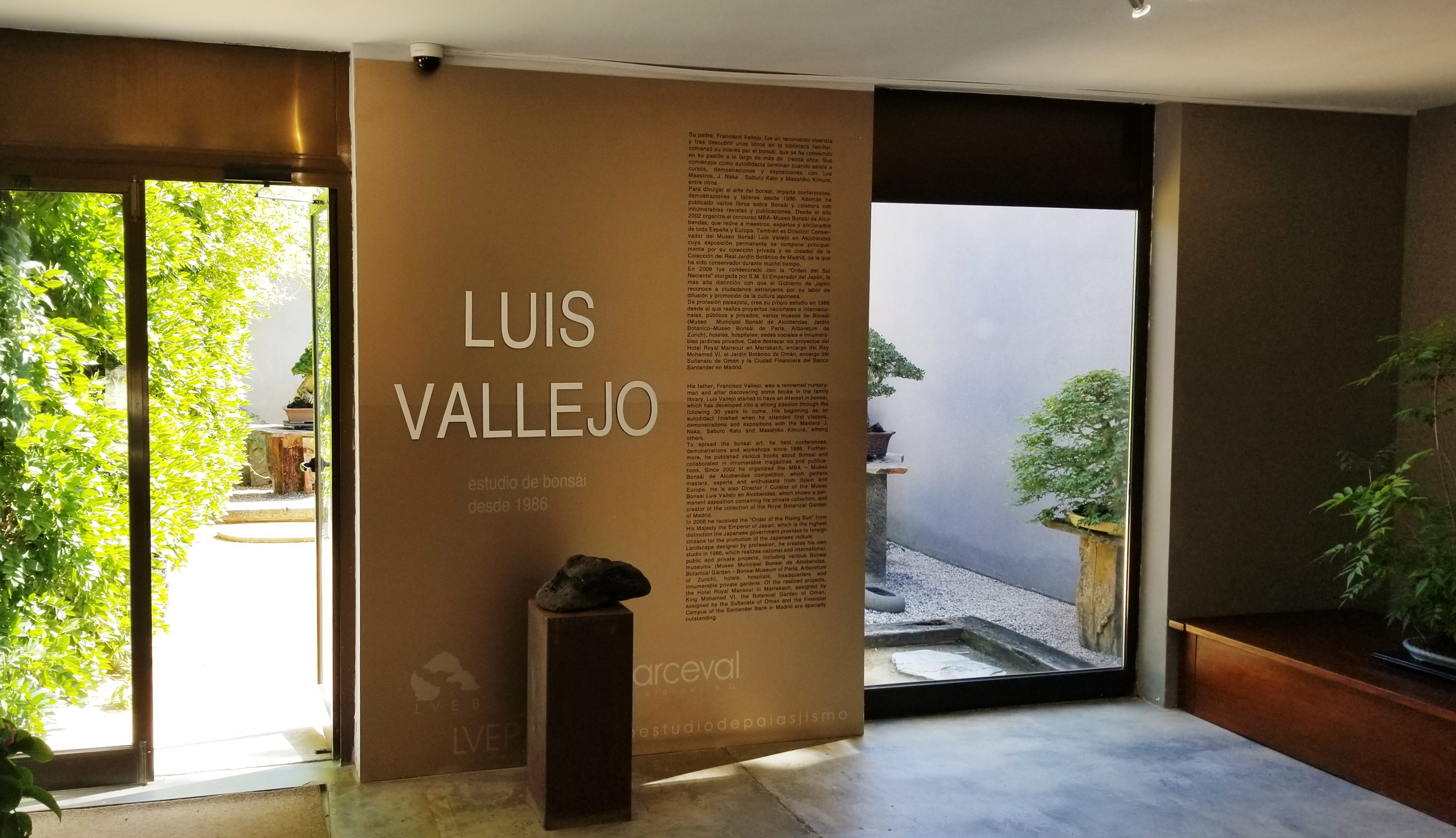
- Location: Av. Olimpica s/n, Arroyo de la Vega, Alcobendas, Madrid, Spain
- Coordinates: 40°32′13″N 03°37′49″W
- Type: Bonsai
- Director: Luis Vallejo
- Architects: Luis Vallejo; Antón Dávila
- Website: luisvallejoestudiobonsai.com/english/ (in English)

The Luis Vallejo Bonsai Museum (Spanish: Museo Bonsái Luis Vallejo) is a public access museum located in Alcobendas, Madrid, Spain, dedicated to the display and study of the art of bonsai. The museum was opened in 1995 and is one of the most important in Europe in its class. The museum presents the personal collection of Luis Vallejo as well as specimens donated by others. The collection is widely considered one of the best outside Japan, with multiple trees having received important awards in Spanish and international competitions.

The museum has a collection of over 300 specimens, with both native and imported species. Most of the trees in the collection have been designed and developed as bonsai by Luis Vallejo and Japanese bonsai masters, such as Hiroshi Takeyama, Saburo Kato, Shinji Suzuki and Masahiko Kimura.

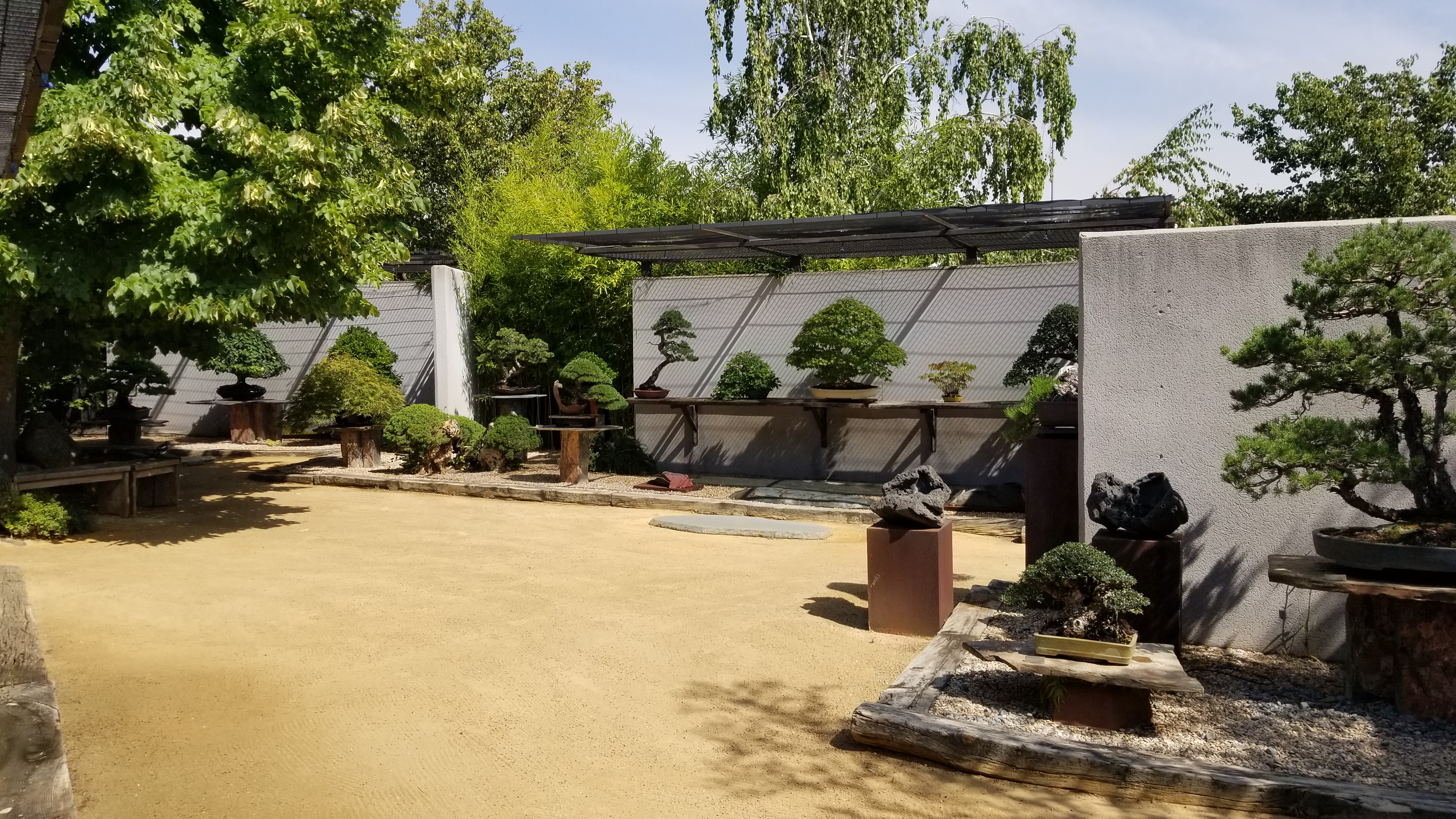
View of the museum in summer 2022.

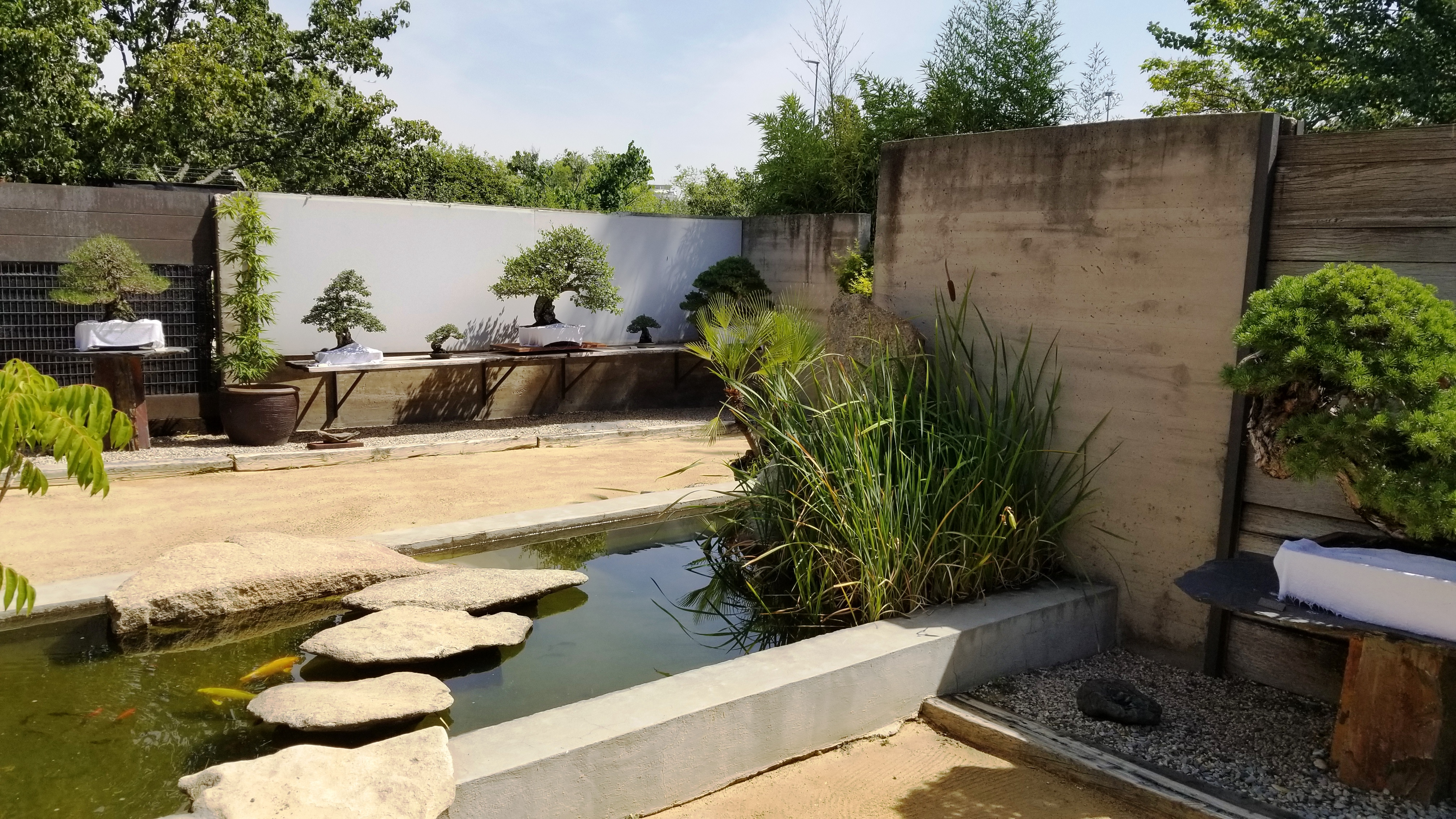
Areas of the museum in the summer of 2022. Notice the use of wet white towels to cool down the root ball of the trees during the exceptional heat wave affecting Madrid on that summer.

== History ==
Luis Vallejo García-Mauriño is an internationally renowned landscape architect, his work includes the gardens of the Royal Mansour Marrakech hotel, the Oman Botanic Garden, the Madrid headquarters of the Santander Financial Group, as well as multiple public and private projects around the world. Vallejo's interest in bonsai began through his father, Francisco. According to Vallejo, his father, landscaper and plant nursery owner, used to acquire books related to his work in his trips, including some on bonsai and Japanese gardens purchased in New York City. The young Luis, who was 14 or 15 years at the time, was mesmerized by this artform, comparing it to "magic": miniature trees and forests, similar to those in nature, planted in small containers and being displayed as works of art.

Vallejo learned the techniques and aesthetics of bonsai by self study and by practicing in his father's nursery. Later on he had the opportunity to travel to Japan and meet some of the great Japanese bonsai artists. By observing and sharing with these experts, Vallejo expanded his expertise, even though he never received a formal education on the subject.

In the 80s, Vallejo organized his first bonsai exhibition, for what was at the time a widely unknown art in Spain, at the Royal Botanical Garden in Madrid. For the show, Vallejo used his own trees as well as others borrowed from early bonsai enthusiasts.

Between 1987 and 1994, Vallejo created, curated and maintained the personal bonsai collection of Spanish Prime Minister Felipe González, a great enthusiast and collector. Years later, González donated his collection to the Spanish National Research Council (Consejo Superior de Investigaciones Científicas (CSIC)). The collection is on display at the Royal Botanical Garden in Madrid.

In 1995 Vallejo opened the Luis Vallejo Bonsai Museum in Alcobendas, in partnership with that Municipality. The museum was designed by Vallejo with the assistance of the architect Antón Dávila in the Japanese style, including a koi pond.

From its inception, the museum has been visited by Japanese Ambassadors, members of the Japanese community in Spain, authorities from Alcobendas and other personalities. Luis Vallejo was awarded in 2008 the Order of the Rising Sun by the Japanese Emperor, Akihito, for his help in spreading the Japanese culture.

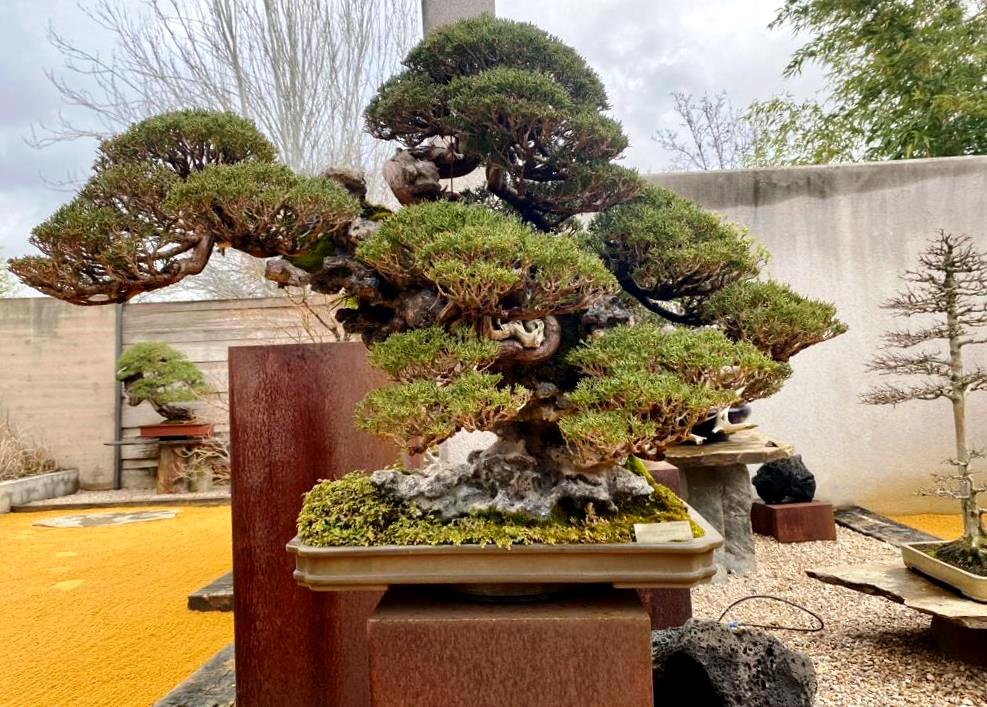
Juniper, part of the museum collection.

== The Collection ==
The museum bonsai collection has over 300 specimens, including native and imported species, and is widely considered among the best in the world outside of Japan. Not all specimens are on display, as the museum has private work and nursery areas for the development and care of the trees. Some of the specimens in the collection exceed the 200 years of age.

Among the species represented in the museum are:

Partial list of species in the collection
Common name	Spain-native species	Non-native species
Azaleas (multiple species)		Genus Rhododendron
Balearic boxwood	Buxus balearica	
Chinese hawthorn		Crataegus cuneata
Chinese quince		Pseudocydonia sinensis
Cork oak	Quercus suber	
European beech	Fagus sylvatica	
European wild olive	Olea europae var. sylvestris	
European yew	Taxus baccata	
Field elm	Ulmus minor	
Ginkgo		Ginkgo biloba
Hinoki cypress		Chamaecyparis obtusa
Hokkaido fir		Abies sachalinensis
Holly oak	Quercus ilex	
Japanese apricot		Prunus mume
Japanese black pine		Pinus thunbergii
Japanese cedar		Cryptomeria japonica
Japanese persimmon		Diospyros kaki
Japanese quince		Chaenomeles japonica
Japanese white pine		Pinus parviflora
Japanese yew		Taxus cuspidata
Japanese zelkova		Zelkova serrata
Judas tree	Cercis siliquastrum	
Maples (multiple species)		Genus Acer
Trident maple		Acer buergerianum
Pomegranate		Punica granatum
Portuguese oak	Quercus faginea	
Potentillas		Genus Potentilla
Russian olive		Elaeagnus angustifolia
Sabina juniper	Juniperus sabina	
Scots pine	Pinus sylvestris	
Shimpaku juniper		Juniperus chinensis

== Activities ==
Besides the permanent display of its collection, the museum publishes books and spreads the art of bonsai by conducting seminars, classes, conferences and professional workshops and demonstrations.

The museum also organizes national bonsai shows and competitions in partnership with the Municipality of Alcobendas, the Japanese Embassy, and Spanish governmental agencies in charge of cultural development. These competitions are open to professionals and bonsai aficionados; quality awards are presented to the best trees.
