= Sein Tu =

- စိန်တူ
- Born: 1929; Maymyo, British Burma
- Died: 21 August 2007 (aged 77–78); Yangon, Myanmar
- Education: Rangoon University; Teachers College, Columbia University; Harvard University
- Occupation: Scholar
- Spouse: Mya Mya Khin
- Children: Two
- Parent(s): Ba Tu, Mya Kyi

Sein Tu (Burmese: စိန်တူ) was a Burmese scholar and member of the Myanmar Arts and Sciences Academy. He graduated with a bachelor's degree in psychology at Rangoon University in 1950 and went to the United States for his graduate education. In 1952, he obtained a master's degree in education psychology at the Teachers College, Columbia University and in 1957, a Ph.D in social psychology at Harvard University.

He returned to Burma to teach psychology at Rangoon University and the University of Mandalay until his retirement in 1984.
