= Aung Min Thein =

Burmese film director and artist

- အောင်မင်းသိန်း
- Born: 1961; Maymyo, Burma
- Died: 7 October 2007 (aged 45–46); Yangon, Myanmar
- Occupations: Film director and artist
- Years active: 1991–2007
- Spouse: Thuza Kyaw

Aung Min Thein (Burmese: အောင်မင်းသိန်း) was a prominent Burmese film director and artist.

== Filmography ==
- 1991: We Love in Myanmar (မြန်မာပြည်တွင်းချစ်သည်)
- 1991: Everything in My Heart (ရင်ထဲရှိတာ)
- ?: Love is Like a Breeze (အချစ်သည်ေလလေပြည်)
- ?: Smile and Relax (ပေါ့ပေါ့ပါးပါးပြုံး)
