= Sudan National Botanical Garden =

Coordinates: 15°36′06″N 32°30′33″E

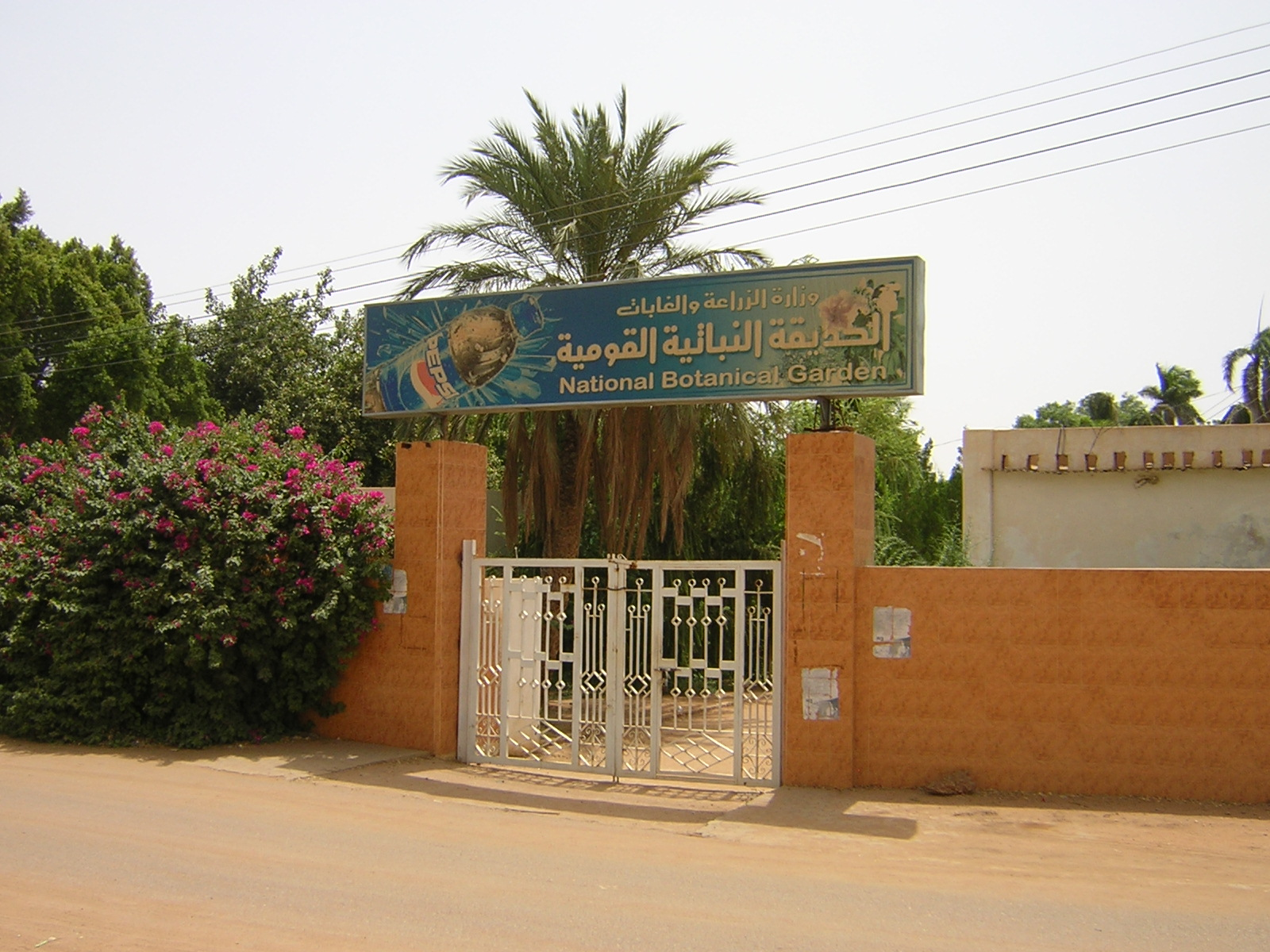
Sudan National Botanical Garden, Khartoum

The Sudan National Botanical Garden, established in 1954, is located in Khartoum in the Mogran residential area. The garden contains a collection of living plants in addition to a herbarium.

== Location ==
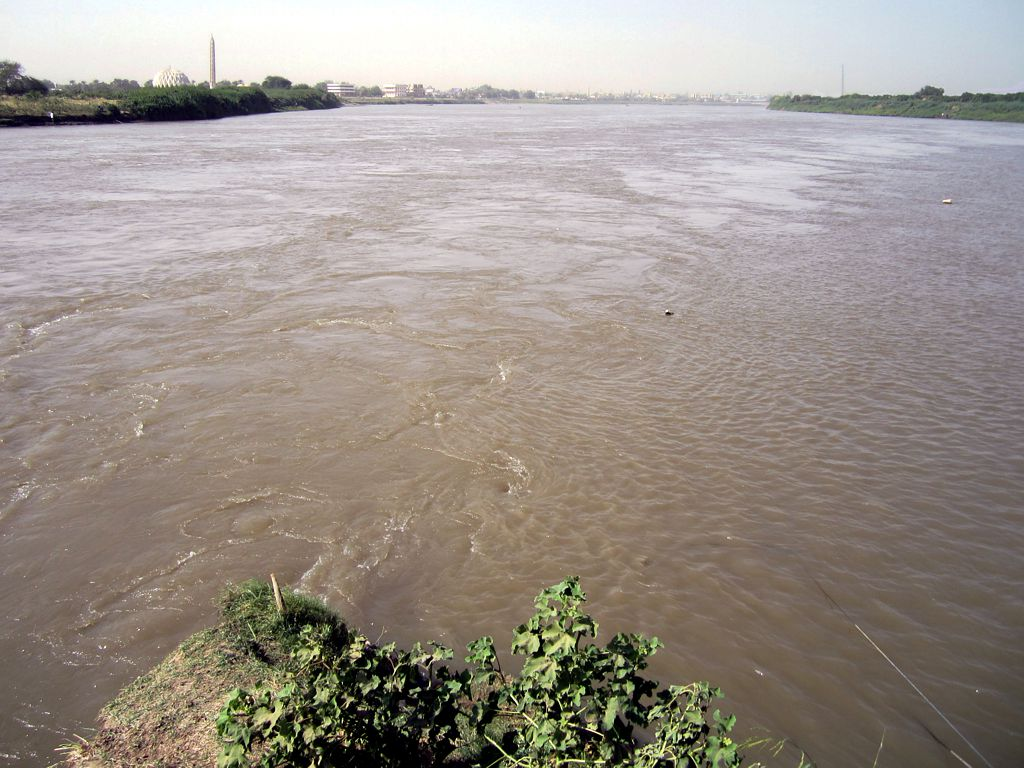
A view of Mogren where Blue Nile meets White Nile Khartoum City, Sudan

The garden is located in the Khartoum Al Mogran area, where the White Nile meets the Blue Nile. The garden area is about 11 acres.

== Administration ==
The garden is administratively affiliated to the Sudan federal Ministry of Agriculture and Irrigation. The garden is listed among the oldest gardens in Africa.

The Garden has several departments and units:

- Seed collection unit.
- Reproduction unit - acclimatization.
- Genetic Resources Conservation Unit.
- Classification unit
- An exchange unit with international parks and research centers.
- Training and Signs Unit.
- Ornamental plants, Coordination and Heritage Unit
- Living unit.
- Unit of plants of economic importance.
- Information tion and Documenttion Unit .

== The tasks and objectives ==
- Conservation and conservation of plant genetic resources.
- Providing the information and the botanical model for researchers, scholars and hobbyists
- General definition of different plants. Cultivation of new varieties of plants
- Conducting scientific research in the various fields of the plant.
- Care of living, library and seed store.
- Organize the information obtained in various plant sciences.
- Establishing, maintaining and maintaining the gene pool.

=== Activities ===
Among the events hosted by the garden is the annual flower exhibition.

=== Opening Hours ===
The garden and the domain are open on official working days, Sunday to Thursday 09:00 to 03:00, and access requires tickets at the gate.

== See also ==
- List of botanical gardens
