= Bantia Botanical Garden =

Coordinates: 12°0.138′N 0°23.079′E

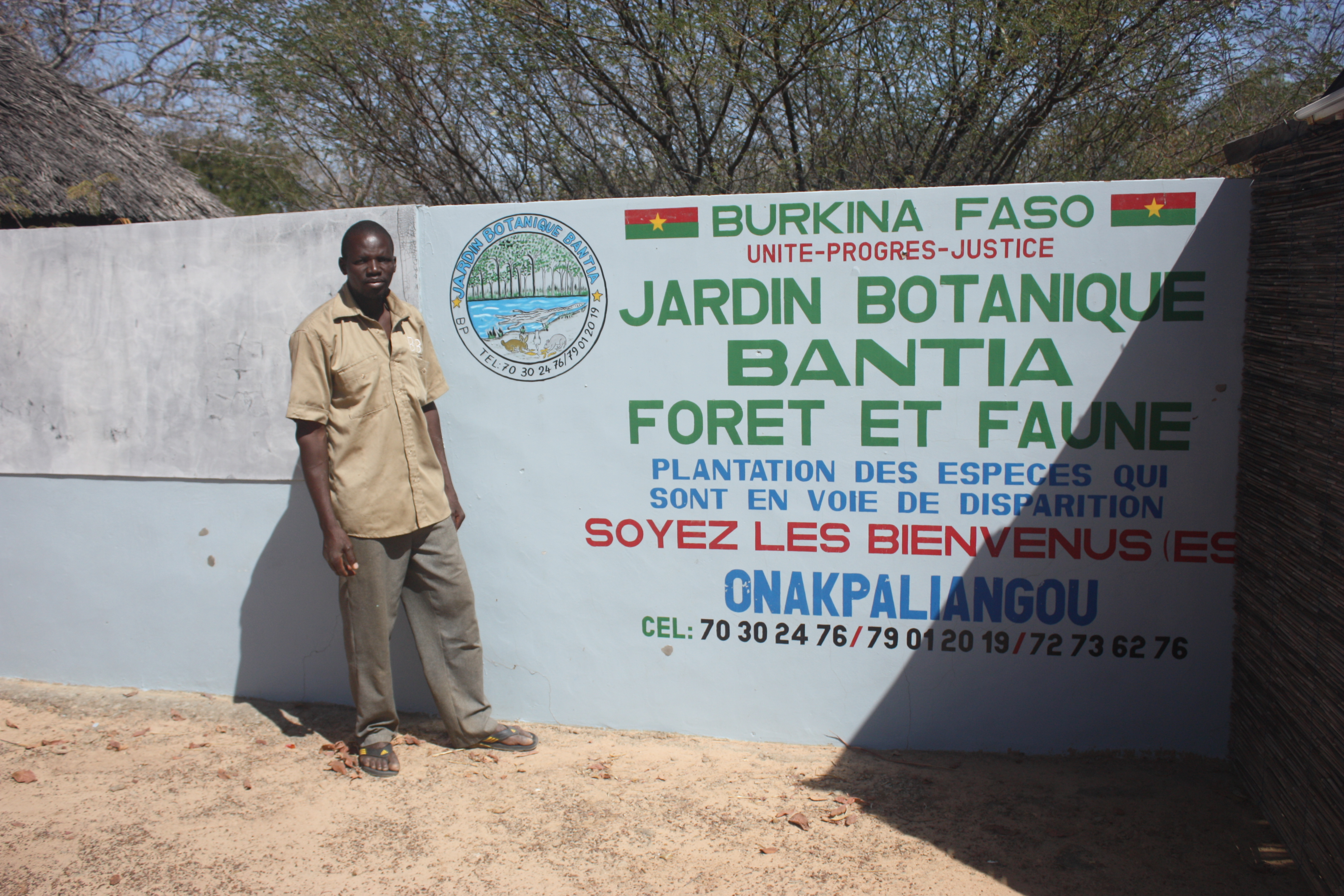
Entrance to the Bantia Botanical Garden with its founder Hampougouni Thiombiano

The Bantia Botanical Garden (in French: Jardin Botanique Bantia) is a botanical garden in Burkina Faso, consisting of an area of Sudanian Savanna, protected from human impact and fire and enriched by local plant species. It was founded in the year 2001.

Situated c. 10 km south of the city Fada N’Gourma at the road towards Pama, it has an area of approximately 10 ha. Paths lead to the different habitats and to a central rest area. Furthermore, the garden includes a small museum and a guest house consisting of several rondavels.

The garden is home to 116 species of trees and 110 species of herbs.
