= Karaca Arboretum =

Private arboretum in Yalova, Turkey

- Location within Turkey
- Location: Yalova, Turkey
- Coordinates: 40°37′55″N 29°13′35″E
- Area: 13.5 ha (33 acres)
- Created: 1980

Karaca Arboretum is a private arboretum located in Yalova, Turkey.

Opened in 1980, it was named after its owner Turkish businessman Hayrettin Karaca. It covers area of 13.5 ha (33 acres).
