= National Kandawgyi Botanical Gardens =

Botanical garden in Burma

Coordinates: 21°59′46″N 96°28′04″E

- ကန်တော်ကြီး အမျိုးသား ရုက္ခဗေဒ ဥယျာဉ်
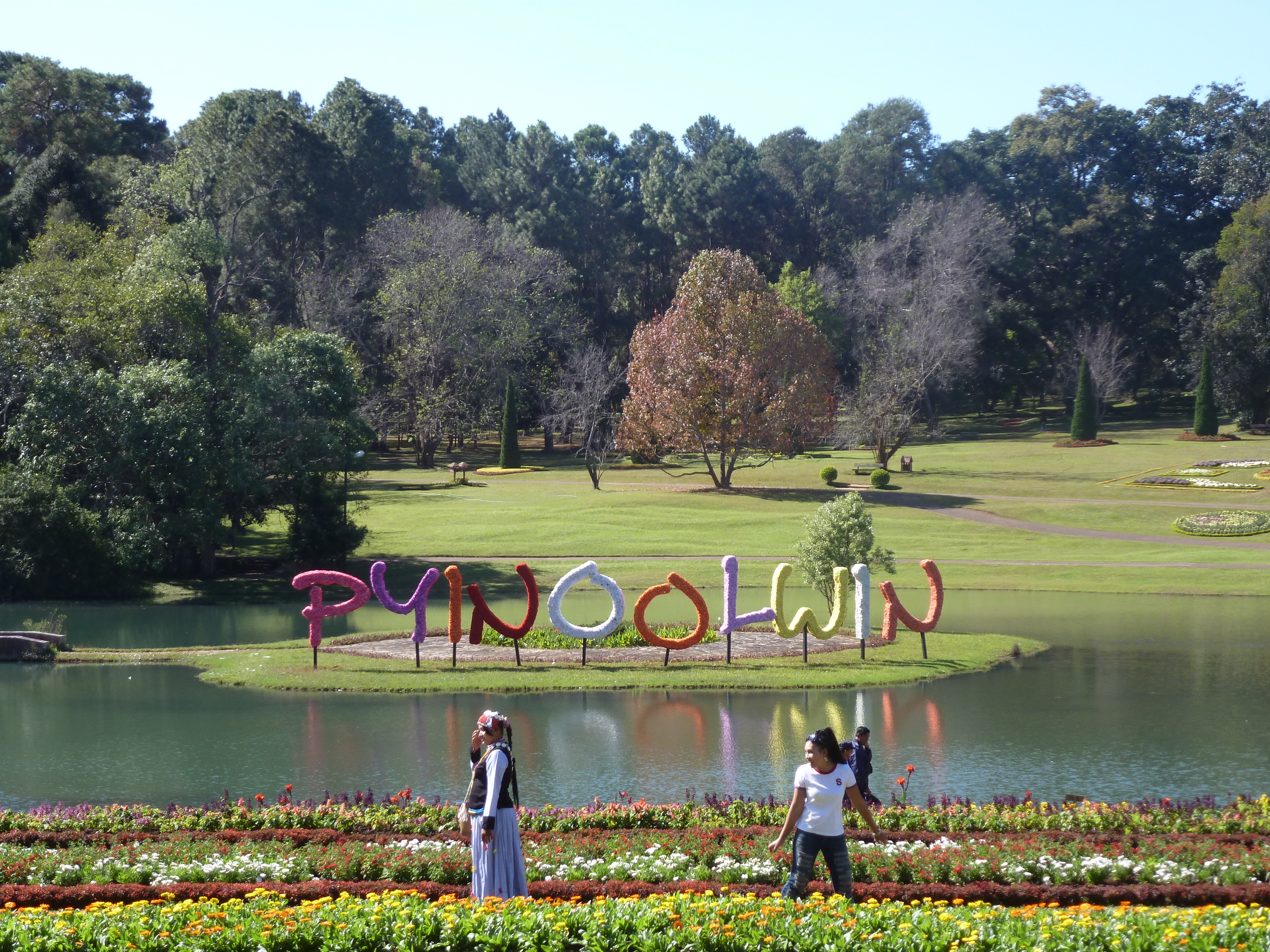
- Interactive map of National Kandawgyi Botanical Gardens
- Type: Urban park
- Location: Pyinoolwin
- Area: 437 acres (177 ha)
- Created: 1915
- Operator: Ministry of Natural Resources and Environmental Conservation
- Status: Open all year

The National Kandawgyi Botanical Gardens (Burmese: ကန်တော်ကြီး အမျိုးသား ရုက္ခဗေဒ ဥယျာဉ်; formerly National Botanical Gardens) is a 177 hectare botanical garden located in the Alpine town of Pyin U Lwin (formerly Maymyo), Burma, situated at an elevation of 1000 metres (3,605 ft) and 69 km (43 mi) by road from Mandalay. The current official name is National Kandawgyi Garden.

== History ==
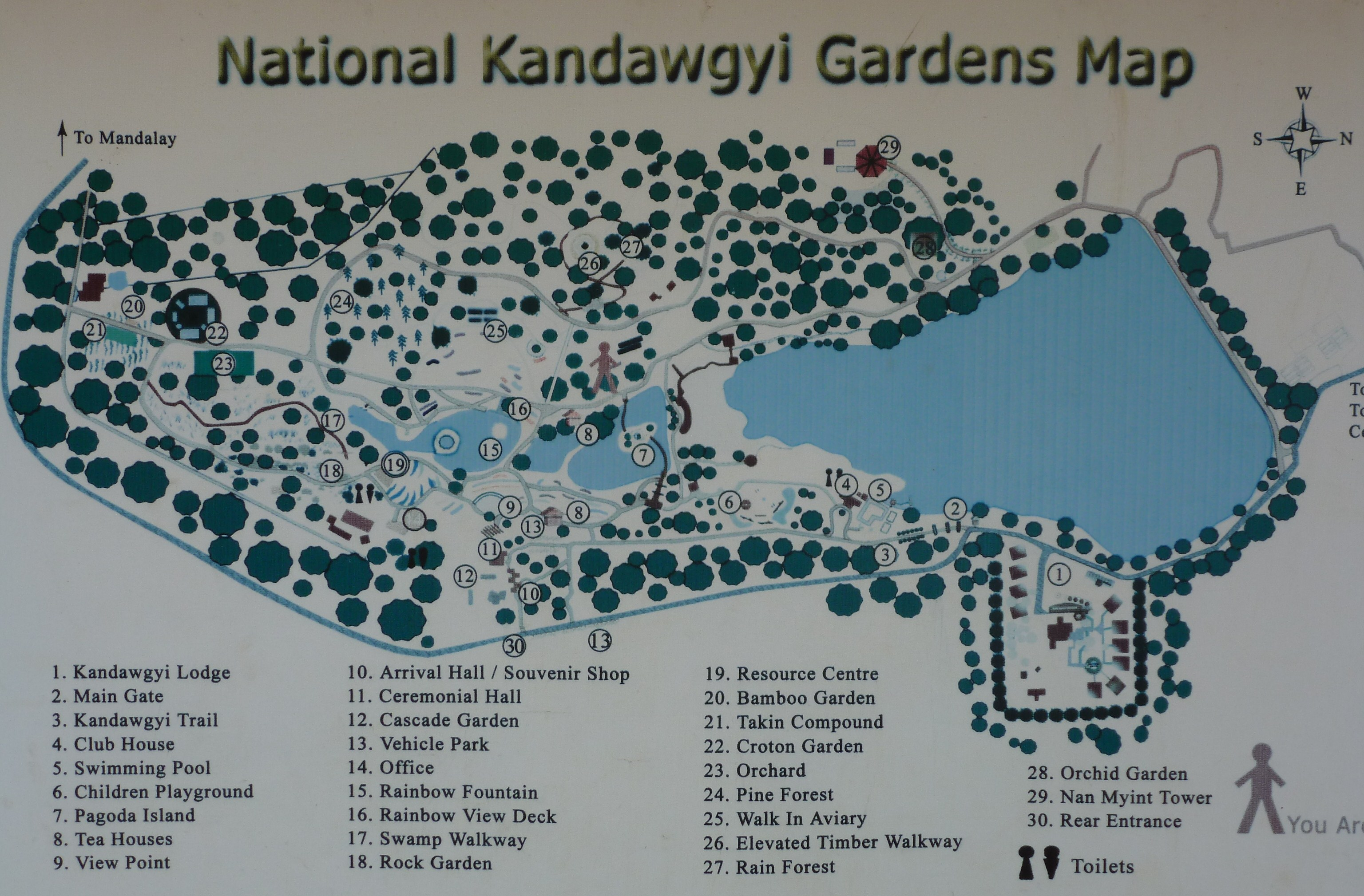
Map of the gardens

It was first established in 1915 as the Maymyo Botanical Gardens by Alex Roger, a Forest Officer. The original site was 30 acres (120,000 m^{2}), and was modelled after the Kew Gardens of England with the help of an amateur gardener, botanical collector and expedition organiser called Lady Cuffe. In 1917, the government granted it official recognition, and in 1924, the site was declared a Government Botanical Reserve. On 1 December 1942, the Ministry of Forestry designated the Botanical Gardens a "protected forest area". On 1 December 2000, Sr Gen Than Shwe renamed it "Kandawgyi National Gardens". It has been used to promote extensive ecotourism in Burma.

== Flora and fauna ==
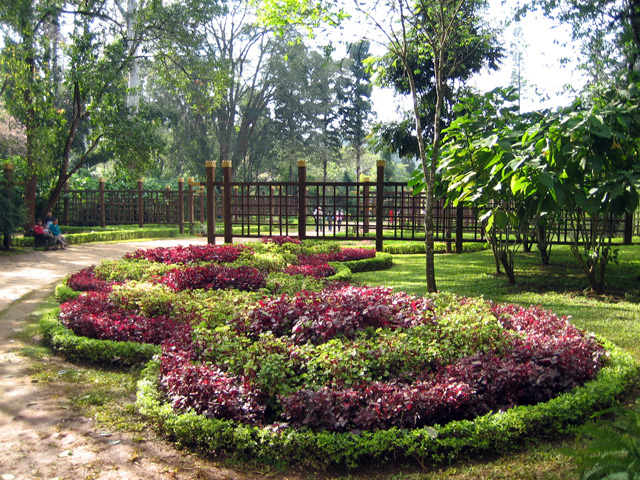
Terraced gardens at the entrance of the Gardens

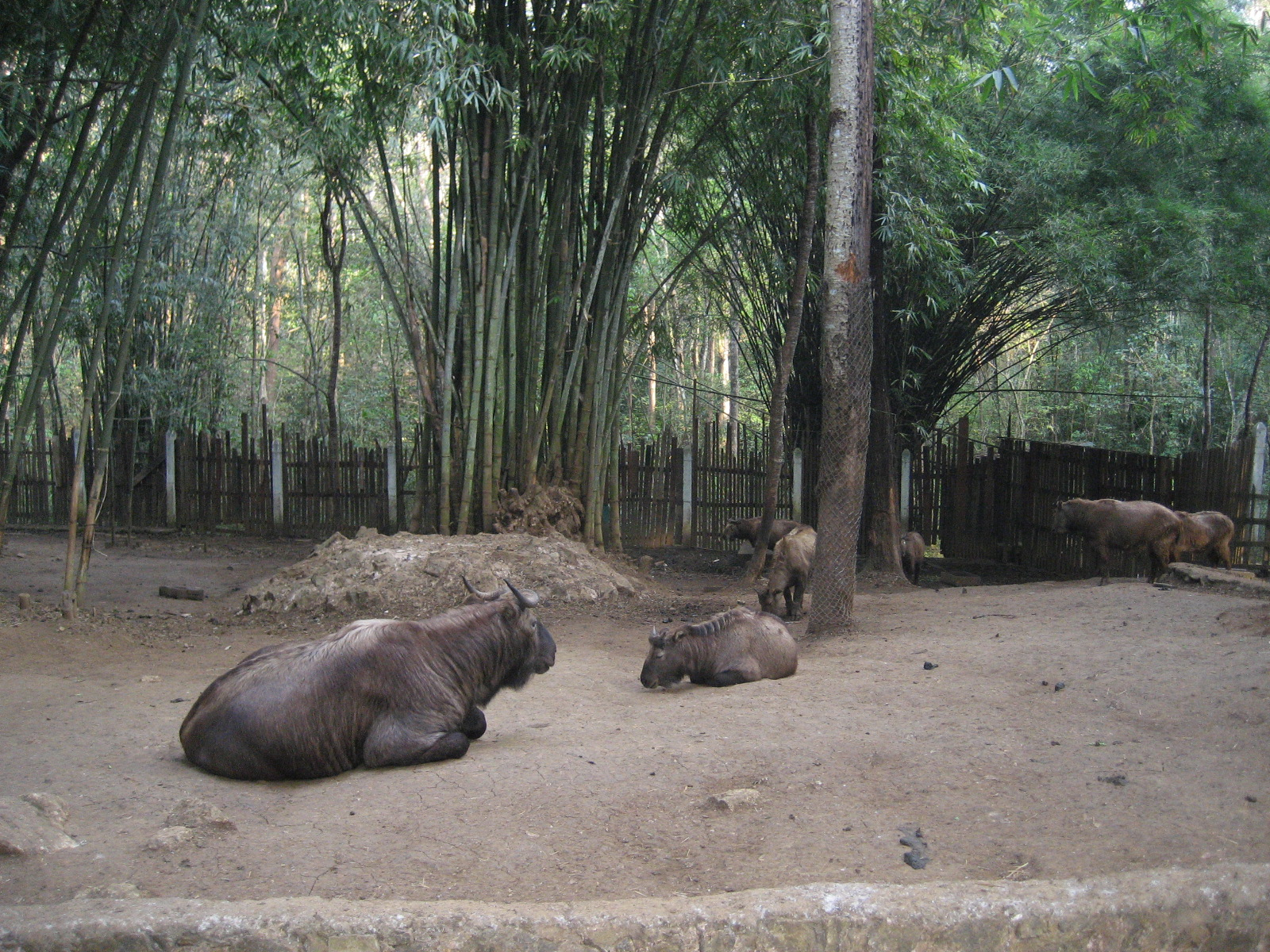
Takin at Kandawgyi

The Botanical Gardens has 514 species of indigenous trees and 74 foreign species, 75 species of bamboo, and 75 species of crotons. Of the 300 species of indigenous orchids, 178 were already collected in 1942. There are 25 rose species, and 6 land lily species. Medicinal plants for traditional medicines are also grown. The National Botanical Gardens is managed by the Ministry of Forestry. Forty two acres of the site are a protected forest area. The gardens are popular among tourists, who enjoy the rolling lawns and Alpine landscape reminiscent of those in England. Endangered wild animals are also kept in the National Kandawgyi Botanical Gardens, including Eld's deer, Burmese star tortoise, takin, hog deer, but there are also pheasant and water fowl. It has collaborated with the UK based Botanic Gardens Conservation International (BGCI) to conserve the indigenous orchids in their natural habitat.

The Botanical Gardens has three museums. The Fossils Museum houses fossils of mammals, reptiles, and invertebrates, and the Petrified Wood Museum displays fossils of plants, colorful stones, toddy-palm roots, as well as things made from fossils of plants. The Butterfly Museum has various species of butterflies from Nepal, Taiwan, South America, Japan and South East Asia.

== Special events ==
Celebrations of the Gardens' Diamond Jubilee were held from 14 December 2006 to 13 January 2007. Kandawgyi has expanded in recent years and reached its current size in 2000. An annual flower festival has been held in December since 2006. The 5 day event this year had over 7 million flowers of 16 local and over 70 foreign species on display. Number of visitors has averaged 400,000 since it was reopened in 2001.

== Gallery ==
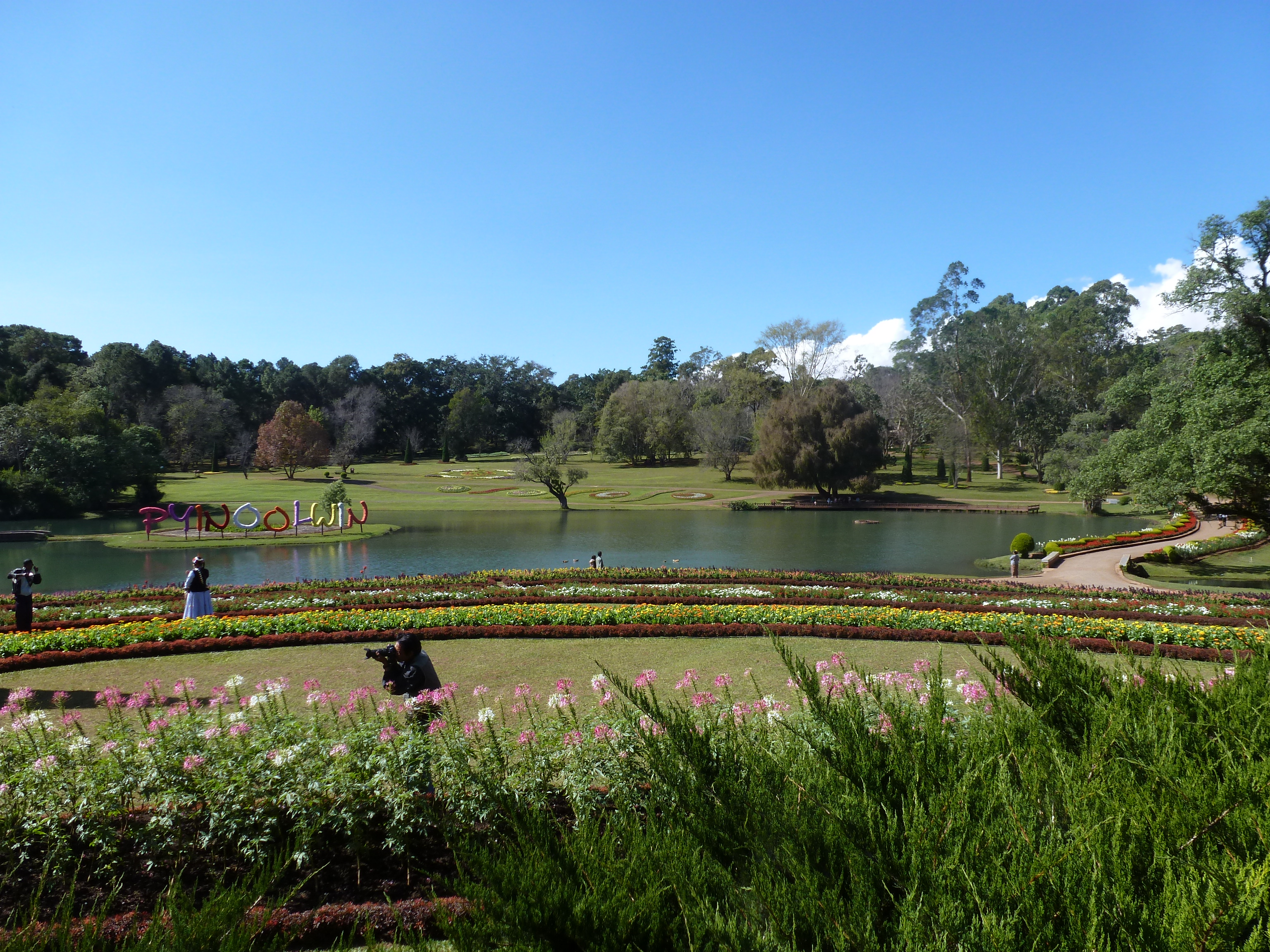

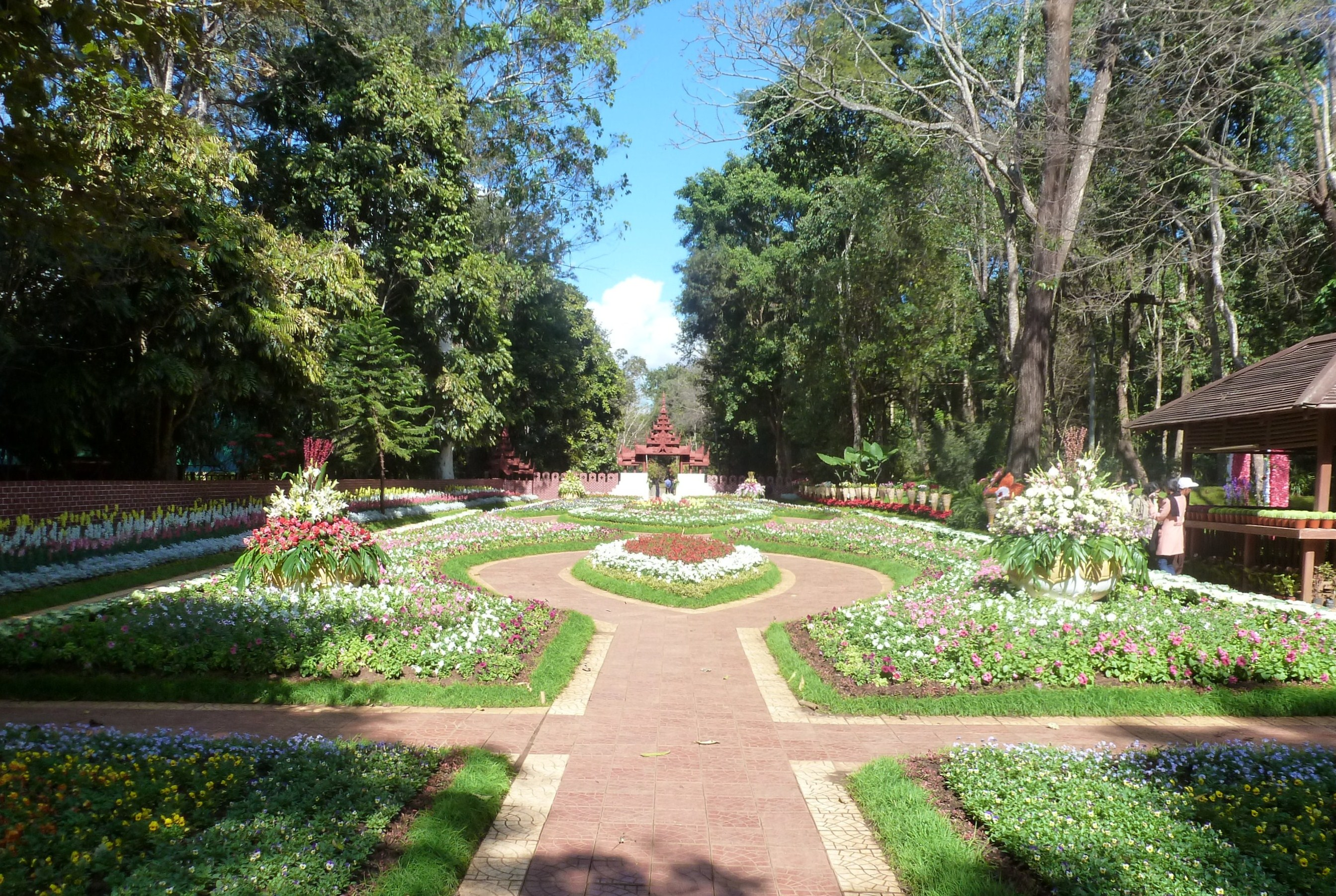

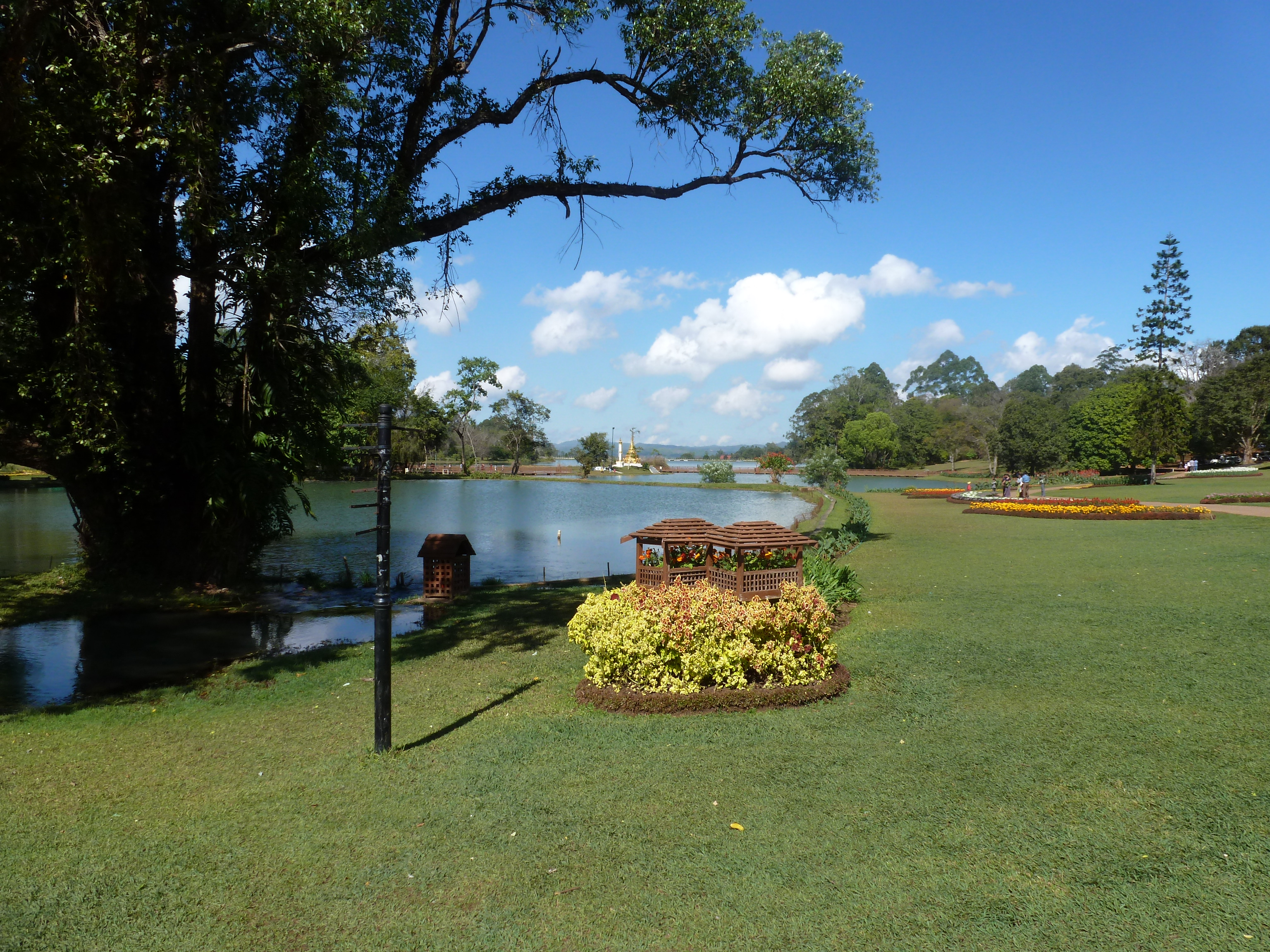

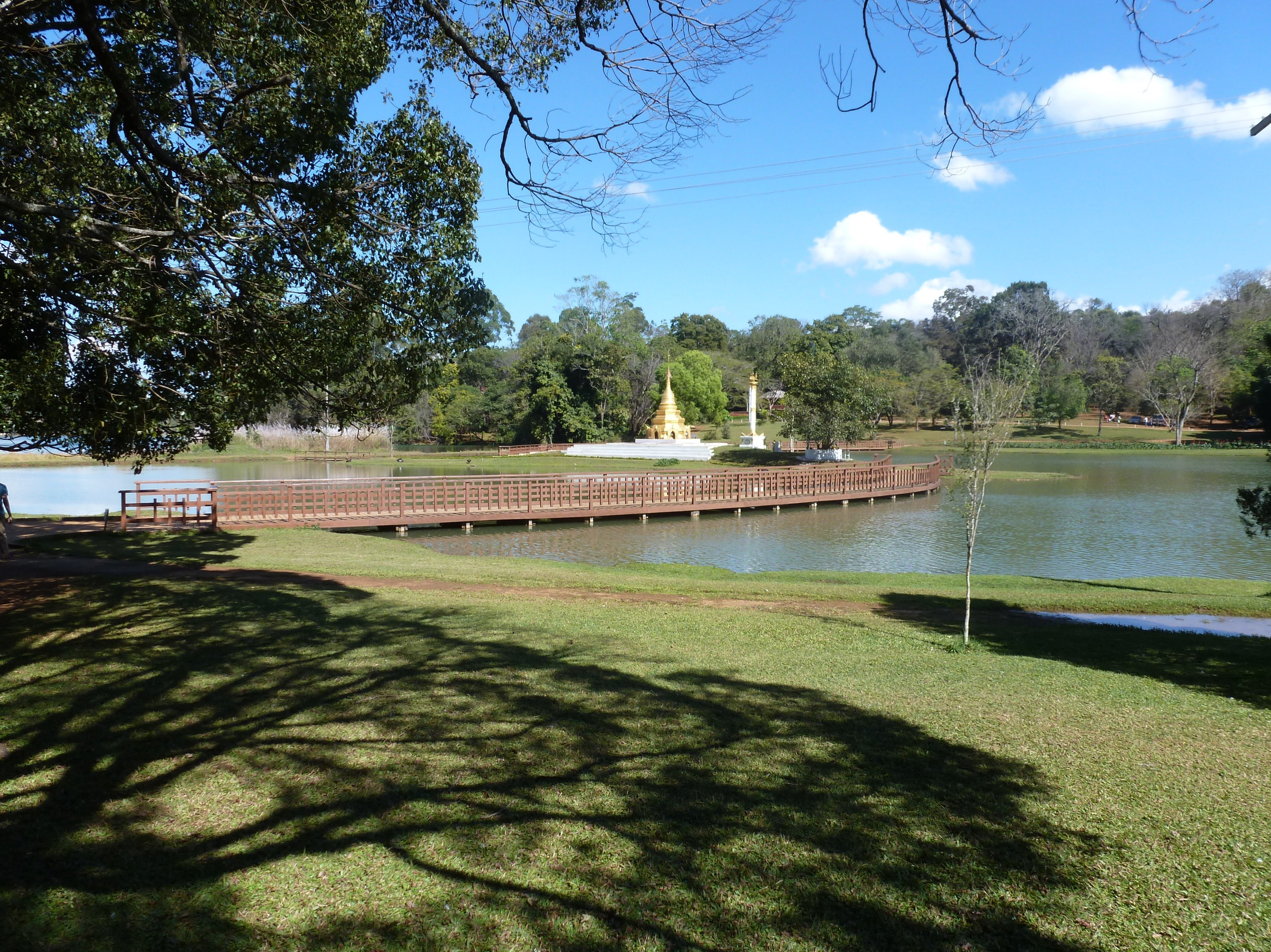
