= Pyin Oo Lwin =

Hill town in Mandalay Region, Myanmar

Pyin Oo Lwin ပြင်ဦးလွင်မြို့ Maymyo, Pan Myodaw
- Town
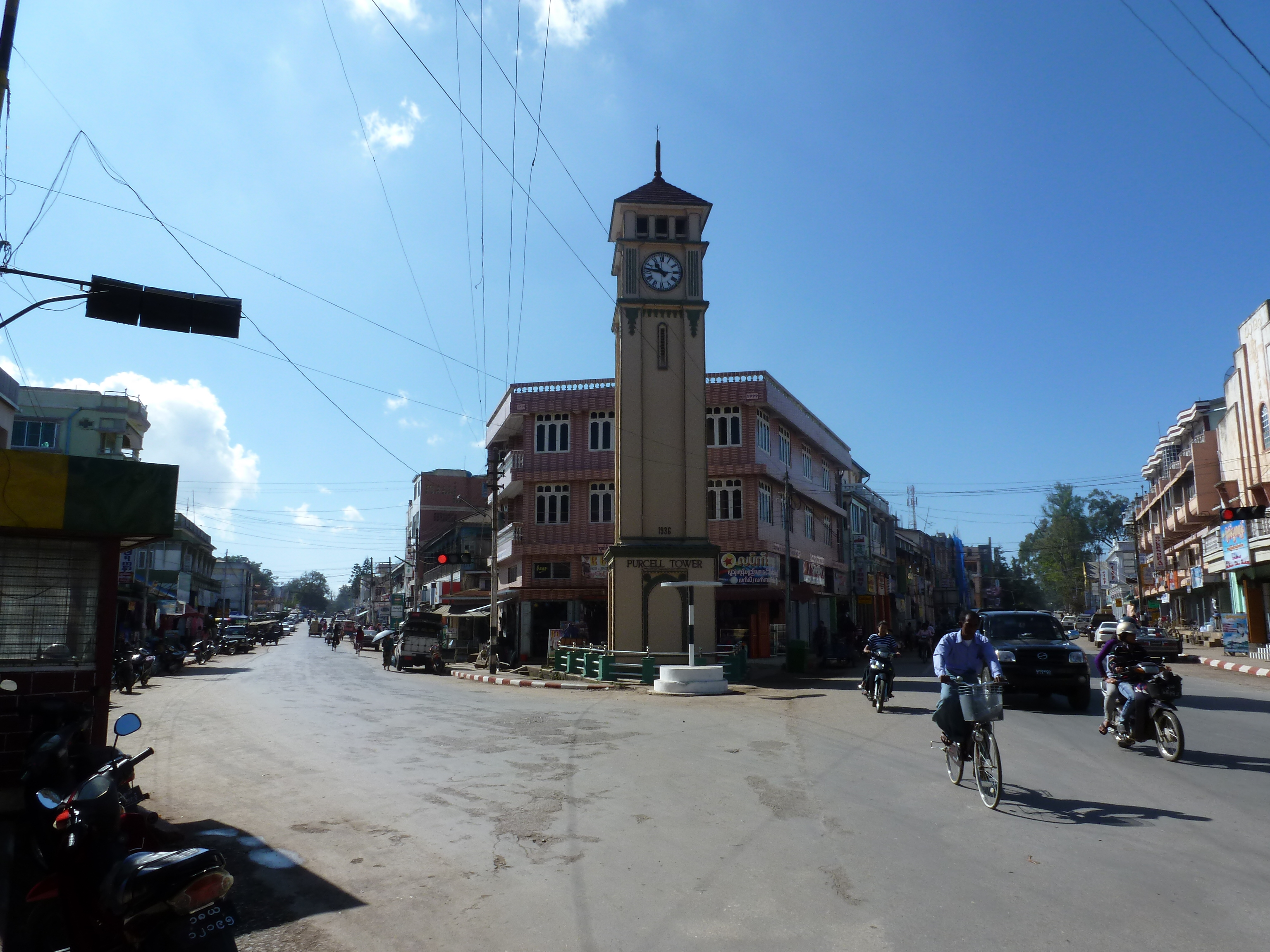
- Downtown Pyin Oo Lwin

- Location within Myanmar
- Coordinates: 22°2′4.38″N 96°27′31.49″E
- Country: Myanmar
- Region: Mandalay Region
- District: Pyin Oo Lwin District
- Township: Pyinoolwin Township

Area
  - Town: 1,990 km^{2} (770 sq mi)
- (township)
- Elevation: 1,070 m (3,510 ft)

Population (2024 census)
  - Town: 361,088
  - Density: 181/km^{2} (470/sq mi)
  - Urban: 149,439
- Time zone: UTC+6:30 (MMT)
- Climate: Cwb

Pyin Oo Lwin (Burmese: ပြင်ဦးလွင်မြို့, MLCTS: prang u: lwang mrui., pronounced [pjɪ̀ɰ̃ ʔú lwɪ̀ɰ̃]; Shan: ဝဵင်းပၢင်ႇဢူႈ, Weng Pang U), formerly and colloquially known as Maymyo (Burmese: မေမြို့, MLCTS: me mrui.), is a hill town in the Mandalay Region of Myanmar, located approximately 67 kilometers (42 mi) east of Mandalay at an elevation of 1,070 metres (3,510 ft). Known as the "City of Flowers" (Pan Myodaw), it served as the summer capital of British Burma and remains one of Myanmar's most popular resort destinations owing to its cool highland climate. The township had a population of 361,088 at the 2024 census, of which 149,439 resided in the urban area.

== Etymology ==
The town has been known by several names throughout its history:

- Pyin Oo Lwin (ပြင်ဦးလွင်) – the current official name, a Burmese transcription of the Shan name Weng Pang U (ဝဵင်းပၢင်ႇဢူႈ), meaning "City of Paang Uu"
- Maymyo (မေမြို့) – literally "May's Town", the colonial-era name still widely used colloquially
- Pan Myodaw (ပန်းမြို့တော်) – "City of Flowers", the best-known nickname
- Taung Sa Kan (တောင်စခန်း) – "Hill Station"
- Taung Hlay Khar (တောင်လှေခါး) – "Hillside Stairs"
- Remyo (ရဲမြို့) – "Soldiers' Town" (historical)

== History ==
=== Early history and founding ===
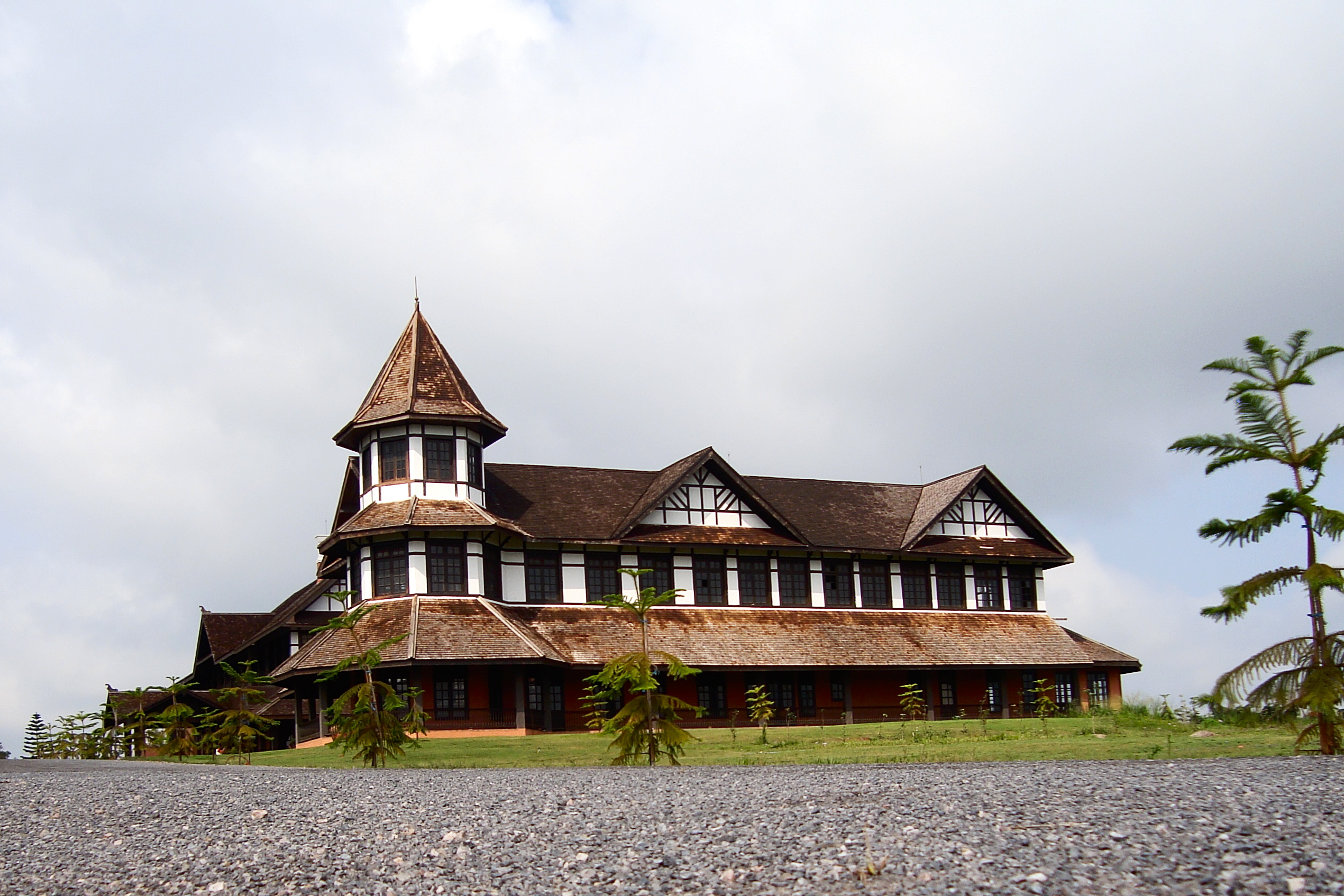
The Governor's House, summer residence of the Governor of British Burma

The area was originally home to a small Shan village of about two dozen households situated on the Lashio–Mandalay trail between Nawnghkio and Mandalay.

Following the British annexation of Upper Burma in 1885, a military outpost was established at the site. In 1897, a permanent military post was founded, and the town subsequently developed into a hill station and the summer capital of British Burma owing to its cooler climate. During the hot season (March–May), the civil, commercial, and military establishments would relocate from Rangoon to Maymyo to escape the lowland heat and humidity.

The British named the settlement Maymyo—literally "May's Town" in Burmese—after Colonel May, a veteran of the Indian Rebellion of 1857 and commander of the Bengal Regiment temporarily stationed there in 1887.

=== Railway development ===
The construction of the Mandalay–Lashio Railway in the late 1890s and early 1900s transformed Pyin Oo Lwin from a remote military post into an accessible hill resort. The line, built to 1,000 millimetres (3.3 ft) metre gauge, passes through the town and continues over the spectacular Gokteik Viaduct—completed in 1901 and at the time the longest railway trestle in the world—on its way to Lashio in the Shan Hills.

=== Colonial era ===
During the colonial period, Maymyo became one of the most important European settlements in Burma. The town was laid out with a circular road, extensive gardens, a golf course, and numerous bungalows and public buildings in the English style. The Candacraig Hotel, originally built in 1904 as a guest house for the Bombay Burmah Trading Corporation, became the social centre of the European community.

During British rule and through the 1970s, Maymyo had a large Anglo-Burmese population, which steadily declined over subsequent decades. During the Japanese occupation (1942–1945), many Anglo-Burmese concentrated in and around Maymyo were incarcerated by the Japanese, who feared their loyalty to the British.

=== Post-independence and renaming ===
After independence in 1948, the military government renamed the town Pyin U Lwin, a word-for-word Burmese transcription of the Shan name. However, the colonial name "Maymyo" remains in widespread colloquial use.

Today, Pyin Oo Lwin retains one of the country's larger Anglo-Burmese communities, alongside significant Indian, Gurkha, and Chinese populations.

=== Battle of Maymyo ===
The area is also the site of the decisive Battle of Maymyo, in which the Burmese royal army under Maha Thiha Thura defeated the Chinese during the third invasion of the Sino-Burmese War (1765–1769).

=== Myanmar civil war (2021–present) ===
Following the February 2021 military coup, the Pyin Oo Lwin area has been affected by the ongoing Myanmar civil war. The town's large military presence—including the Defence Services Academy—has made it a strategic location. Armed clashes between the State Administration Council forces and People's Defence Force units have occurred in surrounding areas, significantly impacting the local tourism industry.

== Geography and climate ==
Pyin Oo Lwin is situated on a plateau in the Shan Hills at an elevation of 1,070 metres (3,510 ft), approximately 67 kilometres (42 mi) east of Mandalay. The surrounding landscape is characterised by rolling hills, pine forests, and cultivated terraces. The town's elevation gives it a noticeably cooler climate compared to the lowlands around Mandalay, with average temperatures roughly 7–10 °C lower than the nearby plains.

The Pyin-O-Lwin Bird Sanctuary, gazetted in 1918, covers an area of 127.25 square kilometres (49.13 sq mi) at elevations between 975 and 1,210 m and is one of four protected wetlands in the region.

Climate data for Pyin Oo Lwin, elevation 1,078 m (3,537 ft) (1981–2010)
Month	Jan	Feb	Mar	Apr	May	Jun	Jul	Aug	Sep	Oct	Nov	Dec	Year
Mean daily maximum °C (°F)	23.4 (74.1)	25.5 (77.9)	28.8 (83.8)	30.6 (87.1)	28.1 (82.6)	27.0 (80.6)	26.4 (79.5)	25.9 (78.6)	26.1 (79.0)	25.9 (78.6)	24.6 (76.3)	22.9 (73.2)	26.3 (79.3)
Daily mean °C (°F)	14.1 (57.4)	16.6 (61.9)	20.5 (68.9)	23.5 (74.3)	22.8 (73.0)	22.8 (73.0)	22.4 (72.3)	22.0 (71.6)	21.8 (71.2)	20.6 (69.1)	17.7 (63.9)	14.7 (58.5)	20.0 (67.9)
Mean daily minimum °C (°F)	4.8 (40.6)	6.6 (43.9)	11.1 (52.0)	14.7 (58.5)	17.4 (63.3)	18.5 (65.3)	18.5 (65.3)	18.2 (64.8)	17.4 (63.3)	15.3 (59.5)	10.9 (51.6)	6.5 (43.7)	13.3 (56.0)
Average precipitation mm (inches)	1.0 (0.04)	6.0 (0.24)	9.0 (0.35)	37.9 (1.49)	142.7 (5.62)	111.6 (4.39)	107.2 (4.22)	126.6 (4.98)	160.1 (6.30)	147.9 (5.82)	37.6 (1.48)	9.3 (0.37)	896.9 (35.3)
Average precipitation days (≥ 0.1 mm)	0.2	0.7	1.0	3.3	8.8	8.4	9.8	11.6	11.9	9.9	3.2	0.8	69.6
Source: NOAA

== Demographics ==
Pyin Oo Lwin has a diverse, multi-ethnic population reflecting its history as a colonial hill station and military garrison. The township had a total population of 361,088 at the 2024 census, with a population density of approximately 181 persons per square kilometre.

The town is home to approximately 10,000 Indian and 8,000 Gurkha inhabitants, descendants of communities that settled during British rule. A thriving Eurasian community exists, consisting mostly of Anglo-Burmese and Anglo-Indians. The broader population includes Bamar, Shan, Chinese, Kachin, Karen, and Chin communities. In recent years, there has been a significant influx of Chinese immigrants, particularly from neighbouring Yunnan province.

== Landmarks and tourism ==
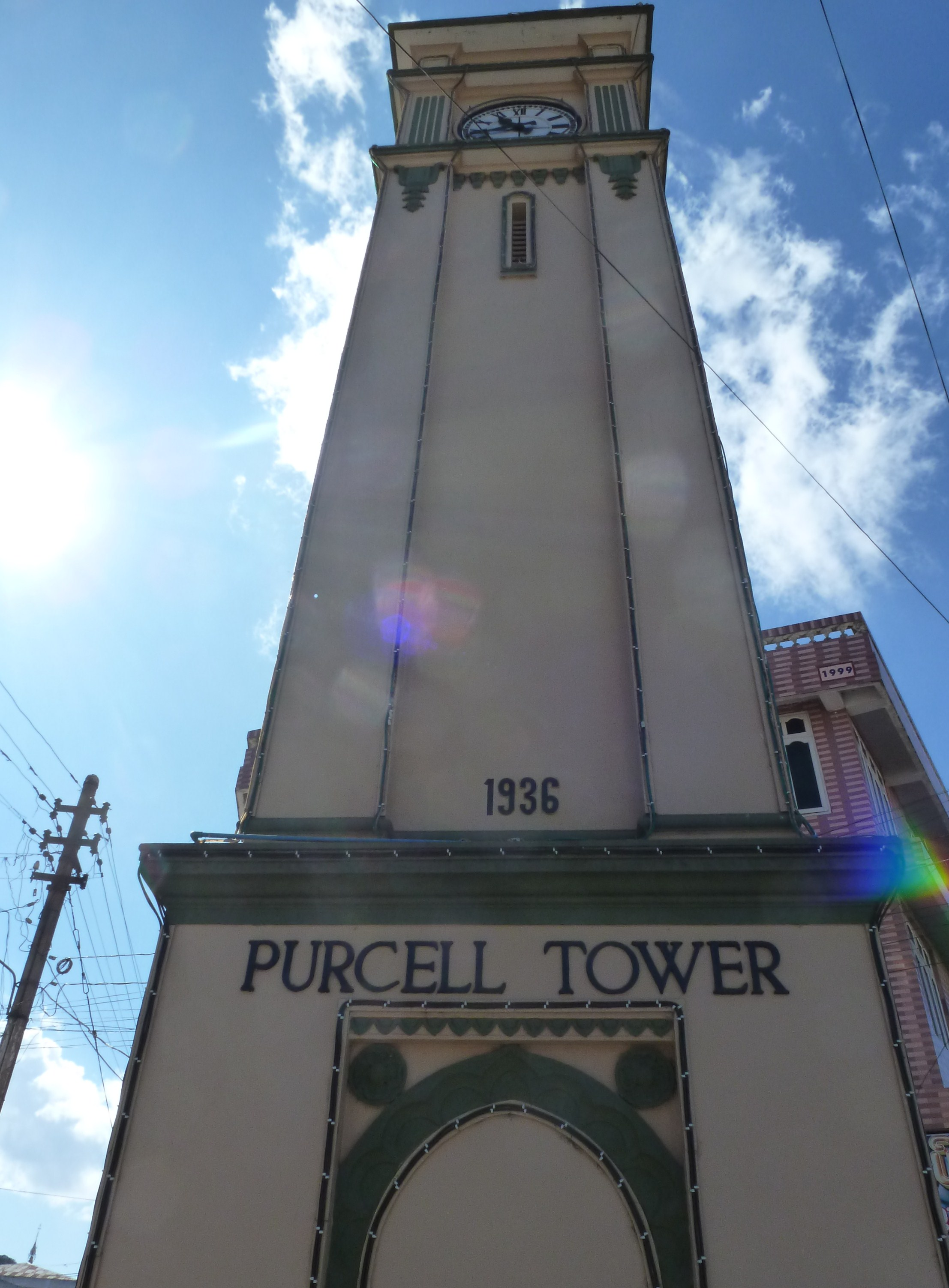
The Purcell Clock Tower, a landmark of downtown Pyin Oo Lwin

=== Purcell Clock Tower ===
The Purcell Clock Tower stands at the centre of the town's main roundabout and is Pyin Oo Lwin's most recognisable landmark. The tower was erected in 1936 to commemorate the Silver Jubilee of King George V. The clock mechanism was manufactured in 1934 by Gillett & Johnston of Croydon, England, one of only a few such clocks produced by the firm.

=== Colonial architecture ===
Pyin Oo Lwin retains a significant collection of colonial-era buildings, many situated along the town's circular road. Notable examples include:

- Candacraig Hotel (now Thiri Myaing Hotel) – built in 1904 as a guest house for the Bombay Burmah Trading Corporation; now a government-operated hotel
- The Governor's House – summer residence of the Governor of British Burma
- All Saints Anglican Church – a colonial-era church containing memorials to British residents
- Numerous private bungalows and cottages in the English style

=== Botanical gardens ===
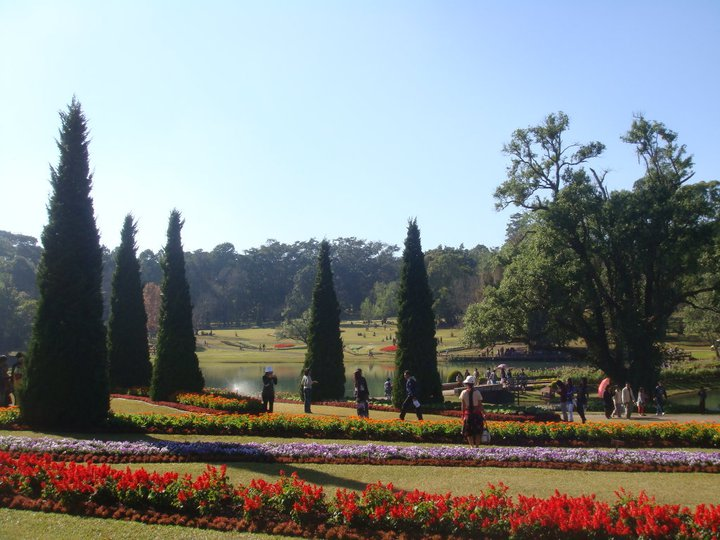
Kandawgyi National Garden

The National Kandawgyi Botanical Gardens, established in 1915 by the British forestry officer Alex Rodger, cover 177 hectares (440 acres) and contain over 500 species of trees, 74 species of bamboo, and numerous ornamental plants. The adjacent Pyin Oo Lwin Nursery propagates plants for gardens throughout Myanmar.

=== Waterfalls ===
Several waterfalls are located in the hills surrounding the town:

- Anisakan Falls – a 122-metre (400 ft) waterfall near Anisakan village, approximately 11 kilometres (6.8 mi) from the town centre
- Pwe Kauk Falls (formerly Hampshire Falls) – a multi-tiered waterfall on the road to Lashio, popular for picnics

=== Gokteik Viaduct ===
The Gokteik Viaduct, located approximately 100 kilometres (62 mi) northeast of Pyin Oo Lwin on the railway line to Lashio, is a major engineering landmark. Completed in 1901 by the Pennsylvania Steel Company, it was at the time the longest railway trestle in the world and remains the highest railway bridge in Myanmar. The scenic train journey from Pyin Oo Lwin across the viaduct to Hsipaw is one of Myanmar's most popular rail experiences.

=== Religious sites ===
The town's multi-ethnic character is reflected in its diverse religious sites:

- Maha Ant Htoo Kan Thar Pagoda (Pyi Chit Pagoda) – one of the most prominent Buddhist pagodas in the town
- All Saints Anglican Church – colonial-era Protestant church
- Shiva Shrine and Shri Pariya Palayathuman Temple – serving the Hindu community
- Several mosques serving the Muslim community

== Transport ==
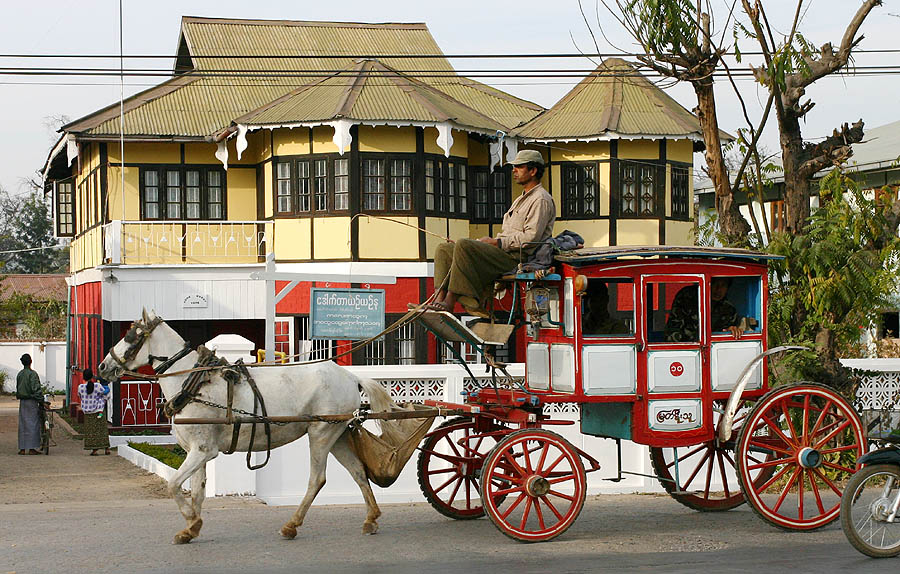
Horse-drawn carriages remain a common mode of transport in Pyin Oo Lwin.

=== Horse-drawn carriages ===
Pyin Oo Lwin is one of the few towns in Myanmar where horse-drawn carriages remain a primary mode of local transport. Dating from the colonial era, the town's horse carts—resembling small covered carriages with painted wooden bodies—are used by both residents and visitors for short journeys around the town.

=== Rail ===
Pyin Oo Lwin is served by the Mandalay–Lashio Railway, a 1,000 millimetres (3.3 ft) metre gauge line. A daily train departs Mandalay at approximately 04:00 and arrives in Pyin Oo Lwin around 08:00, continuing onward to Lashio. The 67 kilometres (42 mi) journey from Mandalay climbs steadily through the Shan Hills and takes approximately four hours. A scenic weekend service between Pyin Oo Lwin and the Gokteik Viaduct has attracted increased passenger numbers in recent years.

=== Road ===
The town is connected to Mandalay by the Mandalay–Lashio Road, with shared taxis and minibuses making the journey in approximately two hours. A highway bus station on the Mandalay–Lashio Road provides connections to other destinations.

== Economy ==
The local economy is centred on flower and vegetable cultivation, sweater knitting, strawberry and pineapple orchards, coffee plantations, and dairy farming. The town serves as a resort destination for visitors from Myanmar's major cities during the hot season and is a popular stop for foreign tourists during the cooler months. The town has approximately 60 licensed hotels and 120 motels.

=== Floriculture and agriculture ===
Pyin Oo Lwin is the centre of Myanmar's commercial flower and vegetable production. The most important flowers grown commercially are chrysanthemums, asters, and gladioli, which are distributed throughout Myanmar year-round. The town's cool climate also supports the cultivation of strawberries, avocados, and temperate vegetables uncommon elsewhere in the country.

=== Coffee ===
Pyin Oo Lwin is the centre of Myanmar's growing coffee industry, with several factories processing locally grown Arabica beans for domestic distribution and export.

=== Sericulture ===
The town is the national centre of sericulture (silkworm rearing). The Sericulture Research Centre, located near the National Kandawgyi Botanical Gardens, serves three functions: the planting and harvesting of mulberry trees (leaves for silkworms, bark for handmade paper), the rearing of silkworms, and the reeling of silk from cocoons.

=== Pharmaceuticals ===
Pyin Oo Lwin hosts a large research centre for indigenous medicinal plants and one of the country's few pharmaceutical production facilities.

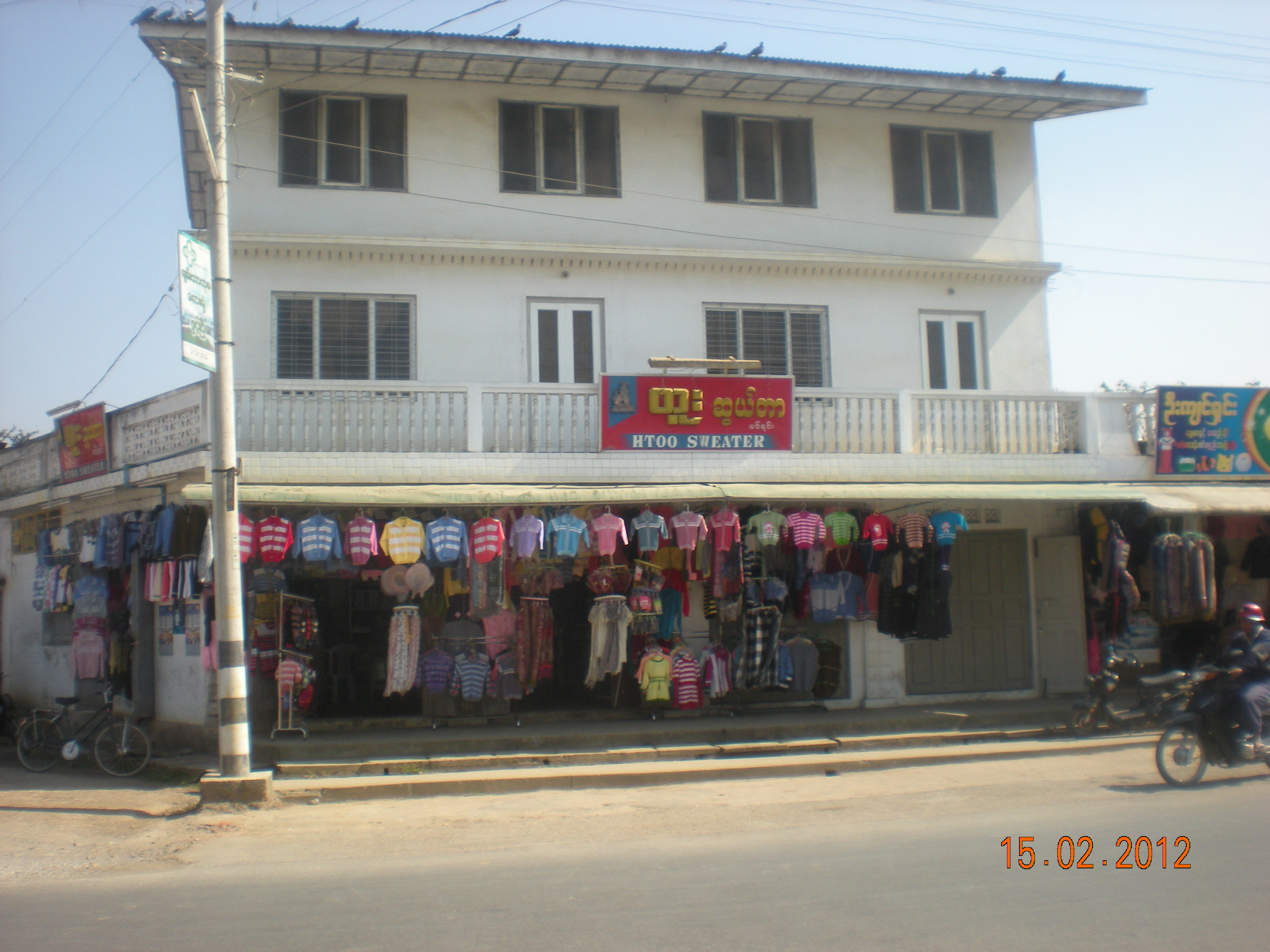
A sweater store in Pyin Oo Lwin

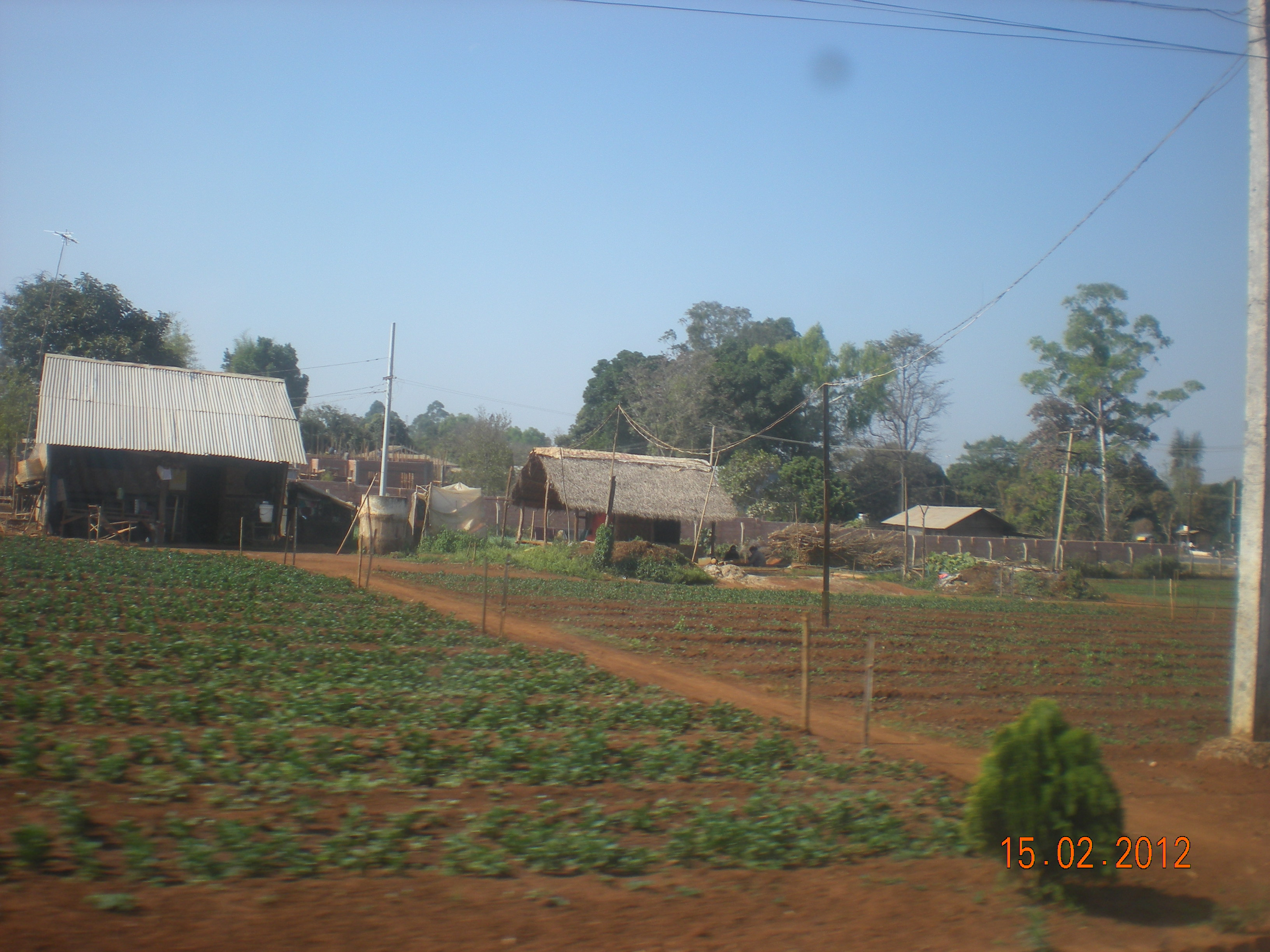
A local strawberry farm

== Education ==
=== Colonial-era schools ===
Maymyo was an important educational centre during colonial times. Several Government English High Schools (GEHSs) were established in the town, including St. Mary's, St. Michael's, St. Albert's, St. Joseph's Convent, and Colgate. British settlers and colonial administrators sent their children—both European and Anglo-Burmese—to be educated at these schools.

=== Military academies ===
Pyin Oo Lwin is home to the Defence Services Academy (DSA), Myanmar's premier military officer training institution, and the Defence Services Technological Academy (DSTA). The town also hosts various schools of military education. There is a significant military presence in and around the town.

=== Other institutions ===
The town hosts the University of Technology (Yadanabon Cyber City), a major centre for IT and engineering education located in the nearby Yadanabon Cyber City development. Several private schools also operate in the town.

== Notable people ==
- General Abdul Hamid Khan (1917–1983) – Chief of Staff of the Pakistan Army during the Bangladesh War and Indo-Pakistani War of 1971
- Aung Min Thein (1961–2007) – Burmese film director and artist
- B. G. Verghese (1926–2014) – Indian journalist born in Maymyo; editor of the Hindustan Times (1969–75) and The Indian Express (1982–86); recipient of the Ramon Magsaysay Award (1975)
- Eric Arthur Blair (1903–1950), better known as George Orwell – British author who underwent police training at Maymyo in late 1923; his experiences in Burma informed his novel Burmese Days (1934)
- Alan Basil de Lastic (1929–2000) – Catholic (Latin Rite) clergyman in India
- Haji U Thein – Chairman of the Islamic Religious Affairs Council of Myanmar
- Hteit Tin Ma Latt – grandchild of Prince Kanaung
- Ma Chit Po (1908–1949) – the only woman to be awarded the Thura Medal
- Prince Taw Phaya (1924–2019) – oldest grandson of King Thibaw Min, the last King of Burma
- Thakhin Ohn Pe – Burmese political figure

== See also ==
- Mandalay–Lashio Railway
- Gokteik Viaduct
- Kandawgyi National Garden
- Hill stations of Southeast Asia
