= Oman Botanic Garden =

Botanical gardens in Oman

The Oman Botanic Garden is a development of the Diwan of Royal Court in Oman, with plants, landscapes, and cultural traditions native to Oman. The gardens are located on 423 hectares in Al Khoud, on the campus of Sultan Qaboos University. The garden's collection includes approximately 1,200 species of plants, displayed in various habitats such as deserts, monsoon cloud forests, and wadis. The garden has several educational exhibits that teach visitors about Oman's plants and how they are utilised.

== Concept ==
At the time of development, the Oman Botanic Garden was the first botanical garden to display the extensive flora of an entire region. The design concept is based on four principles:

- The native flora is represented in naturalistic habitats.
- The garden reflects and honours Oman's botanical heritage.
- The garden demonstrates a sustainable approach.
- The displays are interactive to provide a modern form of education and interpretation.

The garden is the largest botanical garden in the Arabian Peninsula and one of the largest in the world. The garden consists of a nursery, visitor centre, research centre, field study centre, outdoor habitat gardens, northern mountain biome, southern mountain biome, and nature reserve area.

The Oman Botanic Garden project is built upon a foundation of environmental sensitivity and sustainability. The project is built within the limits of a large nature reserve and a “tread lightly” approach was followed in its conception and construction.

Oman Botanic Garden fosters sustainability in its design, construction, and operation. The project is applying for certification for some of the buildings through the Leadership in Energy and Environmental Design (LEED), operated by the US Green Building Council. This places stringent criteria on energy efficiency, sourcing and use of materials, minimizing the use of resources, and communicating best practices.

== Flora and vegetation of Oman ==
The Sultanate of Oman in the southern Arabian Peninsula is mainly characterized by arid habitats, with much of the region occupied by sand dunes or rock and gravel desert. However, and often in stark contrast to the deserts, the country also contains a seasonal cloud forest, open juniper woodlands and other habitats supporting high species diversity with many endemic plants.

Oman lies in the transition zone between the Holarctic and Palaeotropical kingdoms, as well as between subtropical and tropical climate zones. This position is reflected by the presence of plant species from several bio-geographical regions as demonstrated by the comparatively high number of vascular plants in Oman.

Detailed studies of the vegetation and plant communities are still scarce and current knowledge ranges from no documentation at all to brief descriptions of the vegetation types or to characterization of the vegetation units by their complete floristic composition and arranged in a hierarchical system of floristic similarity. Data are also lacking regarding the population parameters and ecology of individual plant species.

Oman has a total of 191 range-restricted (endemics, near endemics and regional endemics) species, representing 13.6% of the total flora. Endemics are found in all vegetation types throughout the country. Some habitats are particularly rich in range-restricted species and are of special interest, encompassing sites of high biodiversity. Highly species-rich habitats include the monsoon-affected mountains in southern Oman, the northern Hajar mountains, and the coastal areas of the central desert; these areas represent local centres of plant endemism.

== History and development of Oman Botanic Garden ==
Following a Royal Decree in 2006 by Sultan Qaboos bin Said al Said, the Oman Botanic Garden project was initiated. The scale and complexity of the project is such that the design and construction work has been divided into multiple phases. Construction of the Oman Botanic Garden started in 2007 with the construction of a native plants nursery on site. and has been functional since 2008. The nursery now houses one of the largest documented collections of Arabian plants in the world, with ca. 70,000 plants in cultivation. The garden also houses a seed bank with currently ca. 5 million seeds, mostly collected from wild specimens.

Many of the architectural, landscape architectural and infrastructure components of Oman Botanic Garden are currently under design or construction, at varying levels of completion, while the plant collection is being grown.

== Oman Botanic Garden staff ==
The current staff structure consists of five departments: Botany and Conservation, Living Collections, Education and Communication, Operations, and Corporate Services. To date, the garden employs 80 staff, including four international experts and 76 Omani nationals.

Several of the team are recruits from the local village, enabling the involvement of the local community with the project and helping to ensure that the benefits and information about the project are shared - an important aspect of the project's sustainability focus.

== Plants collections in Oman Botanic Garden ==
The plant collections of the Oman Botanic Garden include living plants in the nursery, seeds in the seed bank, and preserved plants in the herbarium. The plants grown in the nursery represent one of the largest scientific and documented collection of Arabian Plants. Only very few of the plants of Oman have been propagated or cultivated before, so the work of the nursery is increasing the knowledge and understanding of the country's flora.

The Oman Botanic Garden, botanist, and horticulture teams collect plants as seeds and cuttings through regular field trips; many expeditions have taken place in all areas and habitats of the country to collect, monitor, and record data about Oman's plants and habitats. The majority of the native plants of Oman at the garden are not available commercially.

The overall vision of the habitat gardens is to represent a specific habitat at its best. A habitat design is not formal but provides a representation of the plants in their natural environments. The native plants of Oman will also be used in the amenity areas of the garden, outside of the habitats, to showcase the design potential of using native plants in the landscape.

== Research in Oman Botanic Garden ==
Oman Botanic Garden conducts active research in the areas of flora and vegetation of Oman, propagation and cultivation of native plant species, ethnobotany, plant pests and diseases, and designing with native species. The garden helps to protect the plant diversity of Oman through botanical and horticultural research and conservation.

The garden's Herbarium currently holds 1800 plant vouchers, which are arranged systematically. The herbarium is open to visitors and will also conduct plant genetics research once the research facilities are constructed and ready to use.

The Oman Botanic Garden will form a key part of Oman's response to the Global Strategy for Plant Conservation, part of the Convention on Biological Diversity.

== Education and communication in Oman Botanic Garden ==
The Oman Botanic Gardens aims to encourage visitors to respect and care for the country's indigenous natural environment and learn more about the cultural connection that is believed to exist between plants and people, as well as valuing Oman itself.

Oman Botanic Garden currently develops tests and runs school programmes, programmes for university students, and for other visitor groups. Course material is being developed and further refined. The garden works together with the relevant Ministries, to ensure that the programme of the garden ties in the country's curricula.

== Global botanic garden context ==
There are currently 2,200 botanic gardens known in the world in nearly 150 countries, but there are very few in the Middle East or South-West Asia, although the area is home to an estimated 60,000 plant species.

Oman has a rich botanical heritage and has taken regional leadership in environmental issues. Therefore, the garden will grow only the native species of the region, planted in scientifically accurate and natural habitat gardens.
