= Taungyo =

တောင်ရိုး
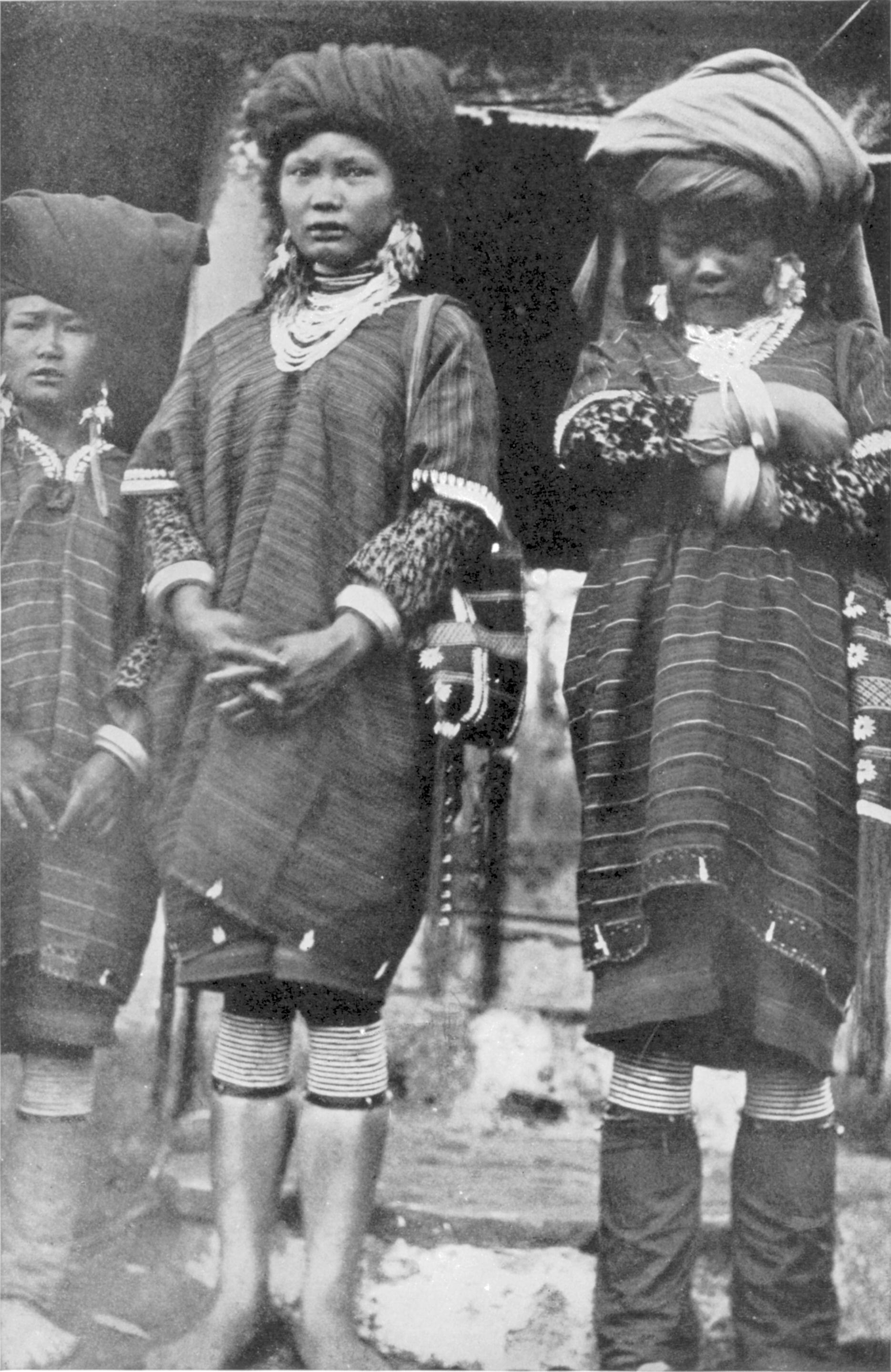
- Taungyo girls (c. 1922)

Total population
- c. 560,000

Regions with significant populations
- Pindaya, Shan State, Burma

Languages
- Taungyo dialect of Burmese

Religion
- Theravada Buddhism

Related ethnic groups
- Bamar, Arakanese, Intha, Danu

The Taungyo (Burmese: တောင်ရိုး လူမျိုး Tauñyoù lumyoù) are a sub-ethnic group of the Bamar people living primarily in Shan State and centered on Pindaya.

== Language ==
They speak Taungyo (တောင်ရိုးစကား Tauñyoùs̱áḵà), a Tavoyan dialect of the Burmese language. Taungyo has 89% lexical similarity with standard Burmese, and is also closely related to Danu, Intha and Rakhine.

A sample of Taungyo dialect vocabulary include the following:

- red - anak (အနီ)
- high - amrang (အမြင့်)
- eye - myak-sai (မျက်စေ့)
- light - lang (လင်း)
