= Pronouns in Burmese =

Burmese pronouns (Burmese: နာမ်စား) are words in the Burmese language used to address or refer to people or things.

== Grammatical markers ==
Burmese has an elaborate case marking system, especially compared to other languages in the region. Subject pronouns begin sentences, though the subject is generally omitted in the imperative forms and in spoken Burmese. Grammatically speaking, subject marker particles (က ([ɡa̰] in colloquial, သည် [θì] in formal) must be attached to the subject pronoun, although they are also generally omitted in spoken Burmese. Object pronouns must have an object marker particle (ကို [ɡò] in colloquial, အား [á] in formal) attached immediately after the pronoun.

== Politeness ==
Burmese exhibits pronoun avoidance, where pronouns are avoided for politeness. This is an areal feature also common in major regional Asian languages like Thai, Vietnamese, Korean and Japanese. In Burmese, speakers account for social distinctions linguistically, reflecting gender, relative age, kinship, social status, and intimacy. Burmese uses "negative politeness," whereby speakers avoid directly addressing people. Instead, Burmese relies on status and kinship terms, titles, and other terms of address, rather than regular pronouns. Burmese kinship terms are commonly substituted as pronouns. For instance, an older person may refer to themselves as ဒေါ်လေး (dau le: [dɔ̀ lé]; "aunt") or ဦးလေး (u: lei: [ʔú lé]; "uncle"), while a younger person may refer to themselves as သား (sa: [θá]; "son") or သမီး (sa.mi: [θəmí]; "daughter") in spoken conversation.

Burmese has a hierarchical system of pronouns, consisting of an open class of pronouns that are grammatically underspecified, but highly marked for the complex relation between speaker and addressee according to their relative position in the society. This feature is also seen in other lowland mainland Southeast Asian languages like Thai and Vietnamese. The prevalence of wet-rice farming in Burmese-speaking areas influenced the development of hierarchical pronouns in Burmese, as society was structured more along hierarchical lines. By contrast, other Tibeto-Burman languages in Myanmar, including Jingpo and Karenic languages, have maintained a grammatical system of pronouns, reflective of their more egalitarian dry-rice farming societies.

== Personal pronouns ==
As a hierarchical system, the set of Burmese pronouns has substantially expanded to include lexical items like nouns and nominal phrases. These pronouns encode pragmatic, social relationships, reflecting the speaker-addressee relationship. In Burmese, the polite forms of first-person pronouns ကျွန်တော် (kya. nau [tɕənɔ̀], lit. 'royal slave') for males, and ကျွန်မ (kya. ma. [tɕəma̰], lit. 'female slave') for females humble the speaker, while the polite forms of second-person pronouns မင်း (min [mɪ́ɴ]; lit. 'lordship'), ခင်ဗျား (khang bya: [kʰəmjá]; lit. 'master lord') or ရှင် (hrang [ʃɪ̀ɴ]; lit. 'ruler, master') elevate the addressee.

Burmese possesses several "true" pronouns inherited from Old Burmese; however these forms have been relegated to use in intimate situations only and are considered rude when used with people of higher status. These include the first-person pronoun ငါ (nga [ŋà]; "I/me") and second-person pronoun နင် (nang [nɪ̀ɴ]; "you"), which are now used only in intimate settings and only with speakers of equal or lower status or age.

=== Basic personal pronouns ===
The personal pronouns are pluralized by suffixing the following particles to the pronoun: တို့ (tui.) or colloquial ဒို့ (dui.).

Person	Usage	Term	IPA	Origin	Usage notes
First	Polite	ကျွန်တော်	/tɕənɔ̀/	lit. 'royal slave'	used by males
First	Polite	ကျွန်မ	/tɕəma̰/	lit. 'female slave'	used by females
First	Polite	ကျွန်ုပ်	/tɕənouʔ/	lit. 'tiny slave'	
First	Polite	မိမိ	/mḭmḭ/	Inherited from Proto-Tibeto-Burman language	
First	Informal	ငါ	/ŋà/	Inherited from Proto-Tibeto-Burman language	used when speaking to one's equals or inferiors
First	Informal	ကျုပ်	/tɕouʔ/	Contraction of ကျွန်ုပ်. lit. 'tiny slave'	
First	Informal	တို့	/do̰/		
First	Informal	ကိုယ်	/kò/	Inherited from Proto-Tibeto-Burman language, lit. 'body'	
Second	Polite	ခင်ဗျား	/kʰəmjá/	Contraction of သခင်ဘုရား, lit. 'master lord'	used by males
Second	Polite	ရှင်	/ʃɪ̀ɴ/	lit. 'ruler, master'	used by females
Second	Polite	(အ)သင်	/(ə)θìɴ/	lit. 'monk, august person'	
Second		လူကြီးမင်း	/lùd͡ʑímɪ́ɴ/	lit. 'elder lord'	
Second	Informal	နင်	/nɪ̀ɴ/	Inherited from Proto-Tibeto-Burman language	used when speaking to one's equals or inferiors
Second	Informal	မင်း	/mɪ́ɴ/	lit. 'lord'	used when speaking to one's equals or inferiors, typically by male speakers
Second	Informal	ညည်း	/ɲí/	Informal	used by females when addressing another female of same age or one younger
Second	Informal	တော်	/tɔ̀/	lit. 'royal'	used by females
Third		သူ	/θù/		
Third		သင်း	/θí̃/		literary usage only
Third		ချင်း	/ʧʰíɴ/		

|- | ဒင်း | /díɴ/ || || |}

=== Kinship terms ===
Spoken Burmese commonly uses kinship terms in place of first, second or third person pronouns. Use of these terms indicates proximity and familiarity between the speaker and addressee, as well as relative age. Female speakers commonly reduplicate the terms for 'older brother' (အစ်ကို > ကိုကို) and 'younger brother' (မောင် > မောင်မောင်) as romantic terms of endearment, while male speakers do not.

Term	Reciprocal term	Usage notes
အဖွား lit. 'grandma'	သား lit. 'son' သမီး lit. 'daughter'	Used for elderly women
အဖိုး lit. 'grandpa'	သား lit. 'son' သမီး lit. 'daughter'	Used for elderly men
အဒေါ် lit. 'aunt' အန်တီ lit. 'auntie'	သား lit. 'son' သမီး lit. 'daughter'	Used for women similar in age to one's parents
ဦးလေး lit. 'uncle' အန်ကယ် lit. 'uncle'	သား lit. 'son' သမီး lit. 'daughter'	Used for men similar in age to one's parents
အမေ lit. 'mom'	သား lit. 'son' သမီး lit. 'daughter'	Used for women similar in age to one's parents, familiar/intimate
အဖေ lit. 'dad'	သား lit. 'son' သမီး lit. 'daughter'	Used for men similar in age to one's parents, familiar/intimate
အစ်မ lit. 'older sister'	ညီ lit. 'younger brother' ညီမ lit. 'younger sister'	Used for females younger than one's parents but older than oneself
အစ်ကို lit. 'older brother'	ညီ lit. 'younger brother' ညီမ lit. 'younger sister'	Used for males younger than one's parents but older than oneself; also used as a romantic term of endearment (by females)
ညီမ lit. 'younger sister'	အစ်ကို lit. 'older brother' အစ်မ lit. 'older sister'	Used for females younger than oneself
ညီ lit. 'younger brother (male ego)'	အစ်ကို lit. 'older brother' အစ်မ lit. 'older sister'	Used for males younger than oneself (by males)
မောင် lit. 'younger brother (female ego)'	အစ်ကို lit. 'older brother' အစ်မ lit. 'older sister'	Used for males younger than oneself (by females); also used as a romantic term of endearment (by females)

=== Religious personal pronouns ===
Other pronouns are reserved for speaking with Buddhist monks. When speaking to a monk, pronouns like ဘုန်းဘုန်း bhun: bhun: (from ဘုန်းကြီး phun: kri:, "monk"), ဆရာတော် (chara dau [sʰəjàdɔ̀]; "royal teacher"), and အရှင်ဘုရား (a.hrang bhu.ra:; [ʔəʃɪ̀ɴ pʰəjá]; "your lordship") are used depending on their status (ဝါ); when referring to oneself, terms like တပည့်တော် (ta. pany. tau ; "royal disciple") or ဒကာ (da. ka [dəɡà], "donor") are used. When speaking to a monk, the following pronouns are used:

	Singular	
	Informal	Formal
First-person	တပည့်တော် (Note: The particle ma. (မ) is suffixed for females.) ta.pany. do	ဒကာ da. ka [dəɡà]
Second-person	ဘုန်းဘုန်း bhun: bhun: ([pʰóʊɴ pʰóʊɴ]) (ဦး)ပဉ္စင်း (u:) pasang: ([(ú) bəzín])	အရှင်ဘုရား a.hrang bhu.ra: ([ʔəʃɪ̀ɴ pʰəjá]) ဆရာတော် (Note: Typically reserved for the chief monk of a monastery.) chara dau ([sʰəjàdɔ̀])

=== Tone sandhi ===
Spoken Burmese exhibits tone sandhi in the form of a shift from a low to an induced creaky tone, to indicate possession. This does not occur in literary Burmese, which uses ၏ ([ḭ]) as postpositional marker for possessive case instead of ရဲ့ ([jɛ̰]). Examples include the following:

ငါ + ရဲ့ = ငါ့
ŋà {} jɛ̰ {} ŋa̰
I {} POSS {} my

နင် + ရဲ့ = နင့်
nɪ̀ɴ {} jɛ̰ {} nɪ̰ɴ
you {} POSS {} your

သူ + ရဲ့ = သူ့
θù {} jɛ̰ {} θṵ
he/she {} POSS {} his/her

The contraction also occurs in some low toned nouns, making them possessive nouns (e.g. အမေ့ or မြန်မာ့, "mother's" and "Burma's" respectively).

== Demonstrative pronouns ==
Burmese demonstrative pronouns are identical to the demonstrative adjectives, but demonstrative pronouns stand alone, while demonstrative adjectives qualify a noun. The most common demonstrative pronouns are listed below. They are usually used for referring inanimate objects, mostly to reference noun or noun phrases. Demonstrative pronouns have the form (pronoun + noun phrase) to demonstrate the previous object.

Gloss	Literary HIGH	Spoken LOW
"this" (pronoun)	ဤ i	ဒီ di ဒါ da
"this" (pronoun)	သည် sany	ဒီ di ဒါ da
"this" (pronoun)	အနှီ a hni	ဒီ di ဒါ da
"that" (pronoun)	ထို htui	ဟို hui အဲသည် e: dhi
"that" (pronoun)	ယင်း yang:	ဟို hui အဲသည် e: dhi
"that" (pronoun)	၎င်း le kaung:	ဟို hui အဲသည် e: dhi
"that" (pronoun)	အနှာ a hna	ဟို hui အဲသည် e: dhi

For example, မောင်သစ်လွင်သည် ဖားကန့်မြို့တွင်မွေးဖွားခဲ့သည်။ "Mg Thit Lwin was born in [the town of] Phakant." ထိုမြို့ကို ကျောက်စိမ်းမြို့တော်ဟုလည်းခေါ်သည်။ "That town is also called 'Jade Land'". In the above example sentence, the demonstrative pronoun ထို "that" is used with the noun မြို့ "town" to refer the ဖားကန့်မြို့ "Phakant".

== Reflexive pronouns ==
Burmese has two alternative forms of the reflexive:

1. literary form: မိမိ ([mḭ mḭ]), often used in conjunction with ကိုယ် (i.e., မိမိကိုယ် 'oneself')
2. spoken form: ကိုယ် ([kò]), used with direct objects and with pronouns (i.e., သူ့ကိုယ်သူ 'himself' or ကိုယ့်ကိုယ်ကို 'oneself')
