= Intha =

Intha may refer to:

- Intha people, a Tibeto-Burman ethnic group living in Burma
- Intha-Danu language, languages of Shan State, Burma, spoken by the Intha and Danu peoples
- Intha, Homalin, a village in Homalin Township, Sagaing Region, Burma
- Intha (gastropod), a genus of gastropods in the family Planorbidae
