= Lokahteikpan Temple =

Buddhist temple in Bagan, Myanmar

Coordinates: 21°09′54″N 94°51′55″E

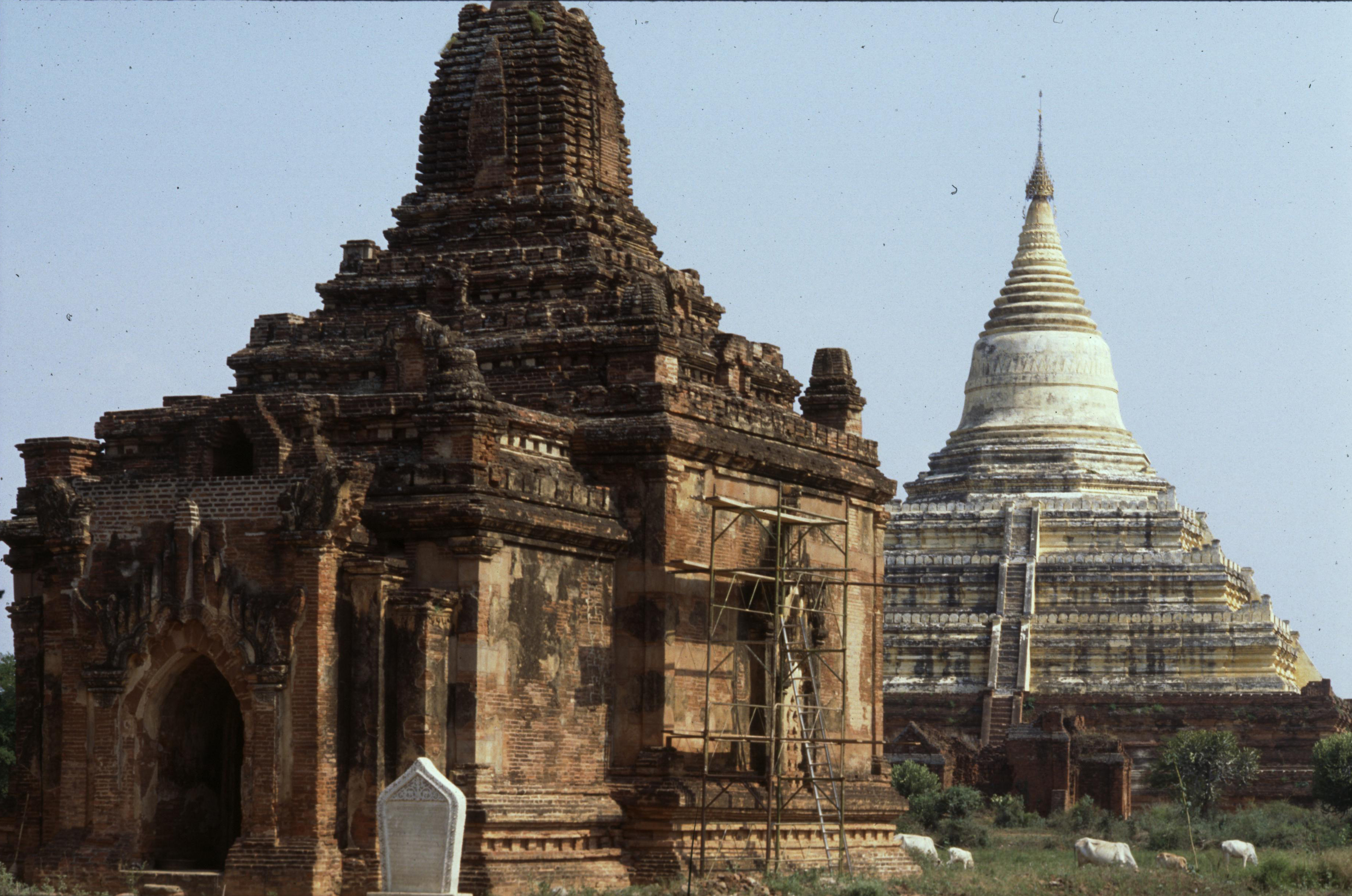
Lokahteikpan

Lokahteikpan (Burmese: လောကထိပ်ပန်) is a small but historically significant Buddhist temple located in Bagan, Myanmar. The temple was founded circa 1125 CE during the reign of King Alaungsithu. It is best known for its fresco paintings and mural inscriptions, which are among the oldest surviving documents written in Old Burmese.

== Architecture and Artistic Features ==
The temple consists of a central hall (gandhakuti) housing a seated Gautama Buddha image. The ceiling and side walls of the Buddha hall are adorned with murals depicting the Five Hundred and Fifty Jataka stories, visualizing the past lives of the Buddha.

These frescoes are notable for their intricate detail and storytelling technique. The mural paintings distinguish kings from commoners through differences in posture and attire. Gender is also clearly represented—men are shown with beards and whiskers, while women are depicted with flowing hair and stylized bodies, reflecting classical ideals of beauty.

The accompanying texts for the murals are written in both the ancient Mon language and Old Burmese, providing valuable linguistic and cultural insights into the 12th-century Bagan period.

== Cultural Significance ==
Lokahteikpan’s inscriptions are among the earliest known examples of the Old Burmese script, making the temple a critical site for historians and linguists studying the evolution of Burmese language, literature, and Buddhist storytelling traditions.
