= Burmese kinship =

The Burmese kinship system is a fairly complex system used to define family in the Burmese language. In the Burmese kinship system:

- Maternal and parental lineages are not distinguished, except for members of the parents' generations.
- Relative age of a sibling relation is considered.
- Gender of the relative is distinguished.
- Generation from ego is indicated.

== History ==
Many of the kinship terms used in Burmese today are extant or derived from Old Burmese. These include the terms used to reference siblings and in-laws.

== Grades of kinship ==
The Burmese kinship system identifies and recognizes six generations of direct ancestors, excluding the ego:

1. Be (ဘဲ) - great-grandfather's great-grandfather (6 generations removed)
2. Bin (ဘင်) - great-grandfather's grandfather (5 generations removed)
3. Bi (ဘီ) - great-grandfather's father (4 generations removed)
4. Bay (ဘေး) - great-grandfather (3 generations removed)
5. Pho (ဘိုး) - grandfather (2 generations removed)
6. Phay (ဖေ) - father (1 generation removed)

The Burmese kinship system identifies seven generations of direct descendants, excluding the ego:

1. Tha (သား) - (1 generation removed)
2. Myi (မြေး) - (2 generations removed)
3. Myit (မြစ်) - (3 generations removed)
4. Ti (တီ) - (4 generations removed)
5. Tut (တွတ်) or Hmyaw (မျှော့) - (5 generations removed)
6. Kyut (ကျွတ်) - (6 generations removed)
7. Hset (ဆက်) - (7 generations removed)

== Extended family and terminology ==
Kinship terms differ depending on the degree of formality, courtesy or intimacy. Also, there are regional differences in the terms used.

=== Common suffixes ===
- female: မ (ma)
- male: ဖ (hpa)

Burmese also possesses kin numeratives (in the form of suffixes):

- eldest: ကြီး (gyi) or အို (oh)
- second youngest: လတ် (lat)
- youngest: လေး (lay), ထွေး (htway), or ငယ် (nge)

=== Relationships ===
The Burmese kinship system also recognizes various relationships between family members that are not found in English, including:

- တူအရီး (tu ayi) - relationship between uncle or aunt and nephew or niece
- ခမည်းခမက် (khami khamet) - relationship between parents of a married couple
- မယားညီအစ်ကို (maya nyi-ako) - relationship between the husbands of two sisters
- သမီးမျောက်သား (thami myauk tha) - relationship between cousins, used in Arakanese language

=== Members of the nuclear family ===
Relation	Term	Form of address	English equivalent	Notes
Father	ဖခင် pha khin	အဖေ a phay ဖေဖေ phay phay	Father	
Mother	မိခင် mi khin	အမေ a may မေမေ may may	Mother	
Elder brother (male ego)	နောင် naung		Brother	
Elder brother (female ego)	ကို ko		Brother	
Younger brother (male ego)	ညီ nyi		Brother	
Younger brother (female ego)	မောင် maung		Brother	
Older sister	မ ma		Sister	
Younger sister (male ego)	နှမ hna ma		Sister	
Younger sister (female ego)	ညီမ nyi ma		Sister	
Husband	လင် lin		Husband	Informal: ယောက်ျား (yaukkya). Formal: ခင်ပွန်း (khinbun).
Wife	မယား maya		Wife	Informal: မိန်းမ (meinma). Formal: ဇနီး (zani).
Son	သား tha		Son	
Daughter	သမီး thami		Daughter	

=== Members of the extended family ===
Immediate lineage
Relation	Term	Form of address	English equivalent	Notes
Parent's father	ဖိုး pho		Grandfather	
Parent's mother	ဖွား phwa		Grandmother	
Father's elder brother	ဘကြီး ba gyi		Uncle	
Father's younger brother	ဘလေး ba lay		Uncle	The youngest uncle may be called ဘထွေး (ba dway).
Father's elder sister	အရီးကြီး ayi gyi		Aunt	
Father's younger sister	အရီးလေး ayi lay		Aunt	The youngest aunt may be called ထွေးလေး (dway lay).
Mother's elder brother	ဦးကြီး u gyi		Uncle	ဝရီး (wayi) is now obsolete.
Mother's younger brother	ဦးလေး u lay		Uncle	
Mother's elder sister	ဒေါ်ကြီး daw gyi		Aunt	Also ကြီးတော် (kyidaw).
Mother's younger sister	ဒေါ်လေး daw lay		Aunt	The youngest aunt may be called ထွေးလေး (dway lay).
First cousin	မောင်နှမ တဝမ်းကွဲ maung hnama ta wun gwe		First cousin	Lit. "siblings one womb removed"

Nephews and nieces
Relation	Term	Form of address	English equivalent	Notes
Sibling's son	တူ tu		Nephew	
Sibling's daughter	တူမ tuma		Niece	

In-laws
Relation	Term	Form of address	English equivalent	Notes
Brother's wife (female ego); Husband's sister	ယောက်မ yaungma		sister-in-law	
Elder brother's wife (male ego); Wife's elder sister	မရီး mayi		sister-in-law	
Younger brother's wife (male ego); Wife's younger sister	ခယ်မ khema		sister-in-law	
Sister's husband Husband's younger brother Wife's brother	ယောက်ဖ yaukpha		brother-in-law	
Elder sister's husband (female ego); Husband's elder brother	ခဲအို khe-oh		brother-in-law	
Younger sister's husband (female ego); Husband's younger brother	မတ် mat		brother-in-law	
Son's wife	ချွေးမ chwayma		daughter-in-law	
Daughter's husband	သမက် thamet		son-in-law	
Spouse's father	ယောက္ခထီး yaukkahti		father-in-law	
Spouse's mother	ယောက္ခမ yaukkhama		mother-in-law	
