= Danu people =

Ethnic group in Myanmar

Danu
ဓနု
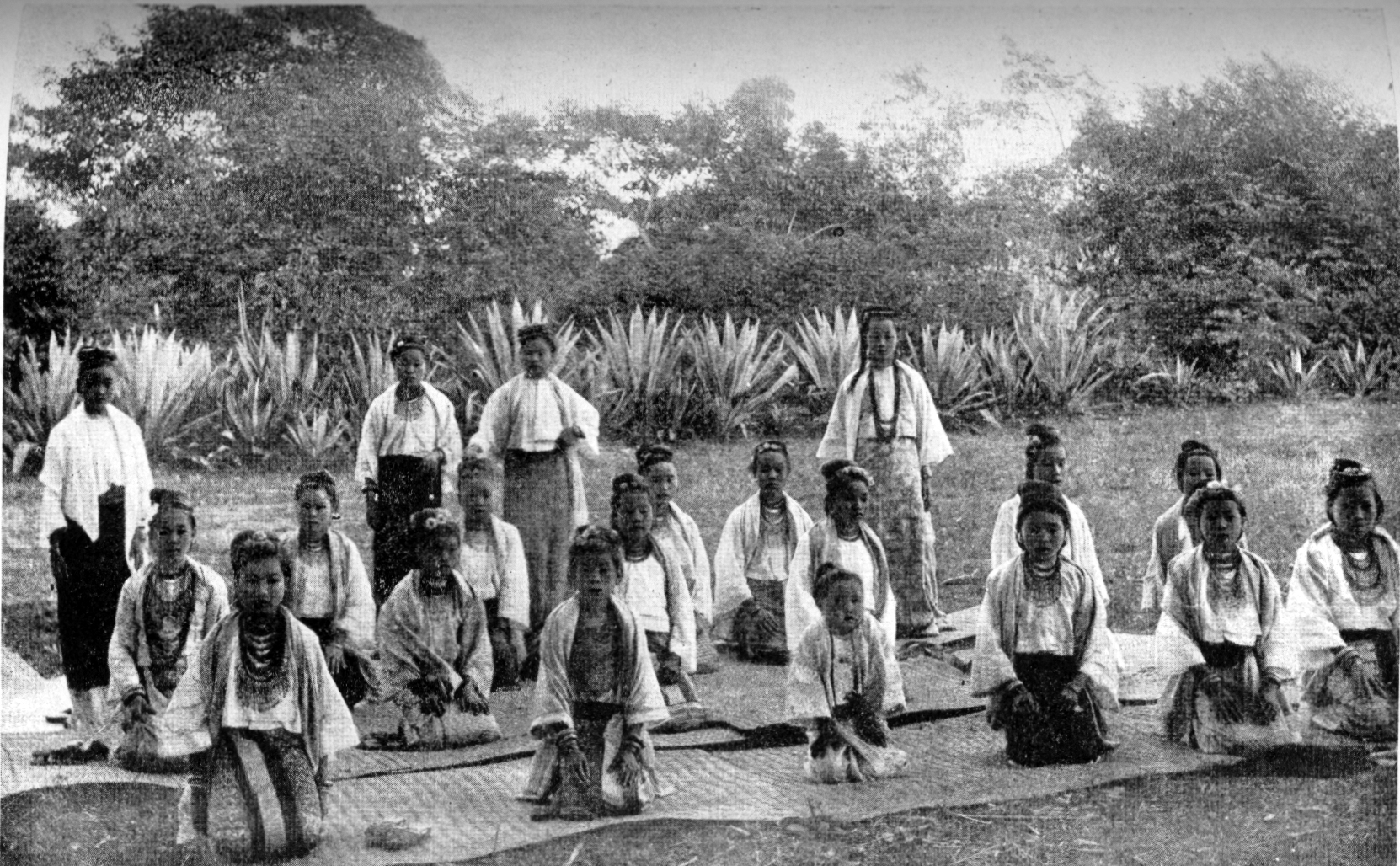
- A troupe of Danu dancing girls in Pindaya (c. 1906)

Total population
- 255,477

Regions with significant populations
- Around Pindaya Caves, Shan State, Myanmar

Languages
- Danu, Burmese

Related ethnic groups
- Bamar, Arakanese, Intha, and other Tibeto-Burman-speaking peoples

The Danu people (Burmese: ဓနု) are a government-recognized ethnic group in Myanmar, predominantly populating the areas near the Pindaya Caves in Shan State. They speak the Danu language, which is closely related to Burmese, the national language.

== Etymology ==
The name Danu derives from the Pali term dhanu, which means "archer" or "bow." The term dhanu is a reference to the legend of Prince Kumarabhaya, whose bow and arrow rescued seven princesses trapped in the caves by a giant spider.

== Origins ==
Some oral traditions trace the ancestry of the Danu to the intermarriages of Burmese men and Shan women in the 16th century, coinciding with the expansionist policies of King Bayinnaung, who oversaw the establishment of Burmese administrative posts throughout the kingdom, including in Shan city-states.

== Notable Danu people ==
- Aung Myat – former Chief Minister of Shan State
