= Myeik dialect =

Burmese dialect, Merguese

Myeik
- Mergui, Merguese
- Region: Southeast
- Native speakers: (250,000+ cited 1997)
- Language family: Sino-Tibetan: (Tibeto-Burman); Lolo–Burmese; Burmish; Southern; Burmese; Myeik

Language codes
- ISO 639-3: –
- Glottolog: merg1238

The Myeik dialect, also known as Beik in Burmese, Mergui and Merguese in English, and Marit (มะริด) in Thai, is a divergent dialect of Burmese, spoken in Myeik, the second largest town in Tanintharyi Region, the southernmost region of Myanmar. Beik shares many commonalities with the Tavoyan dialect, although there are substantial differences especially with regard to phonology.

== Phonology ==
=== Consonants ===
Beik possesses 27 consonant phonemes:

	Bilabial	Dental	Alveolar	Postalveolar and palatal	Velar and labiovelar	Glottal	Placeless
Plosive and affricate	pʰ p b	tʰ t d t̪		tɕʰ tɕ dʑ	kʰ k ɡ	ʔ	
Nasal	m	n		ɲ	ŋ		ɴ
Fricative			sʰ s z			h ɦ	
Approximant				j	w		
Lateral		l					

Unlike Standard Burmese, the Myeik dialect does not have any preaspirated consonants. Phonemes unique to the Myeik dialect include /ɦ/ and /t̪/.

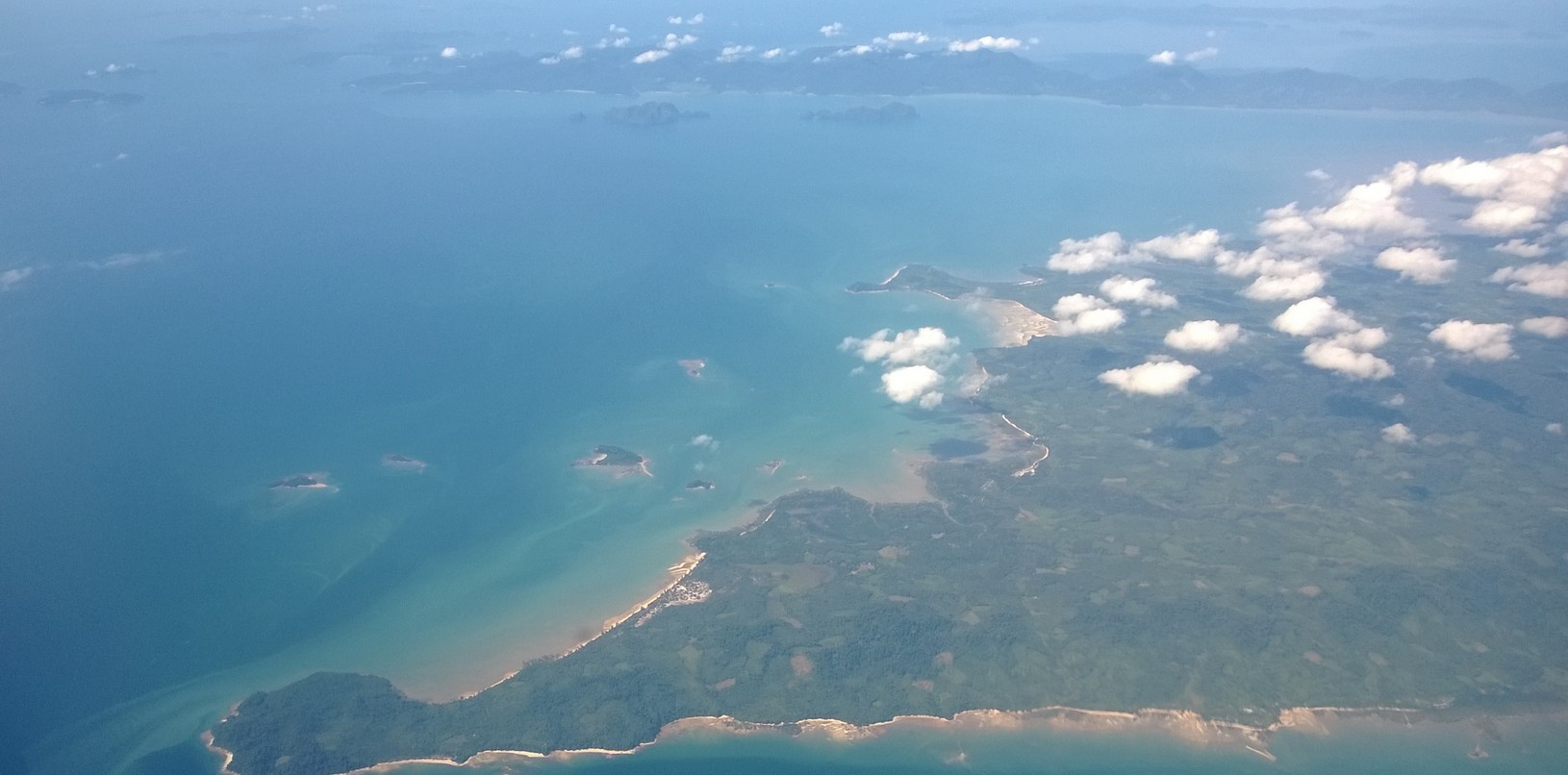
Mergui Archipelago

Mergui Archipelago

=== Vowels ===
The Myeik dialect has three types of vowels: plain, nasalized and glottalized, with each type having seven vowels.

	Monophthongs		Diphthongs	
	Front	Back	Front offglide	Back offglide
Close	i	u		
Close-mid	e	o	ei	ou
Open-mid	ɛ	ɔ		
Open		a	ai	au
