= Middle Burmese =

Form of Burmese spoken from 1500 to 1800

- Region: Present-day Burma
- Era: 16th century–18th century
- Language family: Sino-Tibetan: (Tibeto-Burman); Lolo–Burmese; Burmish; Middle Burmese
- Early form: Old Burmese
- Writing system: Burmese script

Language codes
- ISO 639-3: –
- Glottolog: None

Middle Burmese was a form of the Burmese language spoken from the 16th century to the 18th century. Its beginning roughly corresponds with the rise of the Taungoo Dynasty and its transition to Modern Burmese with the beginning of the Konbaung Dynasty. Its transition to Modern Burmese occurred in the 18th century. Middle Burmese is characterized by stabilization of Burmese orthography and steady evolution of the Burmese phonology, which accelerated during the transition from Middle Burmese to Modern Burmese.

The transition from Old Burmese to Middle Burmese included phonological changes (e.g., mergers of sound pairs that were distinct in Old Burmese) as well as accompanying changes in the underlying orthography.

The transition between Middle Burmese and Modern Burmese was dominated by substantial changes in pronunciation, more so than that between Old Burmese and Middle Burmese. However, many features of Middle Burmese have been preserved in the literary tradition (high register) of written Modern Burmese, including grammatical markers and lexical particles. Word order, grammatical structure and vocabulary have remained markedly comparable, well into Modern Burmese, with the exception of lexical content (e.g., function words).
