= Minn Latt =

- Born: July 19, 1925; Rangoon, Myanmar
- Died: 1985; Shan State, Myanmar

Htun Kyi, pen name Minn Latt Yekhaun (Burmese: မင်းလတ်; 19 July 1925–1985) was a Burmese linguist who studied and published in Czechoslovakia. He returned to Burma to fight as a member of the Burmese Communist Party but was later shot by his own comrades.

== Works ==
- Latt, Minn (1958). "The Prague Method Romanization of Burmese". Archiv Orientální. 26: 145–167.
