= Intha people =

Ethnic group in Myanmar

Intha
အင်းသား
- Flag of the Intha people

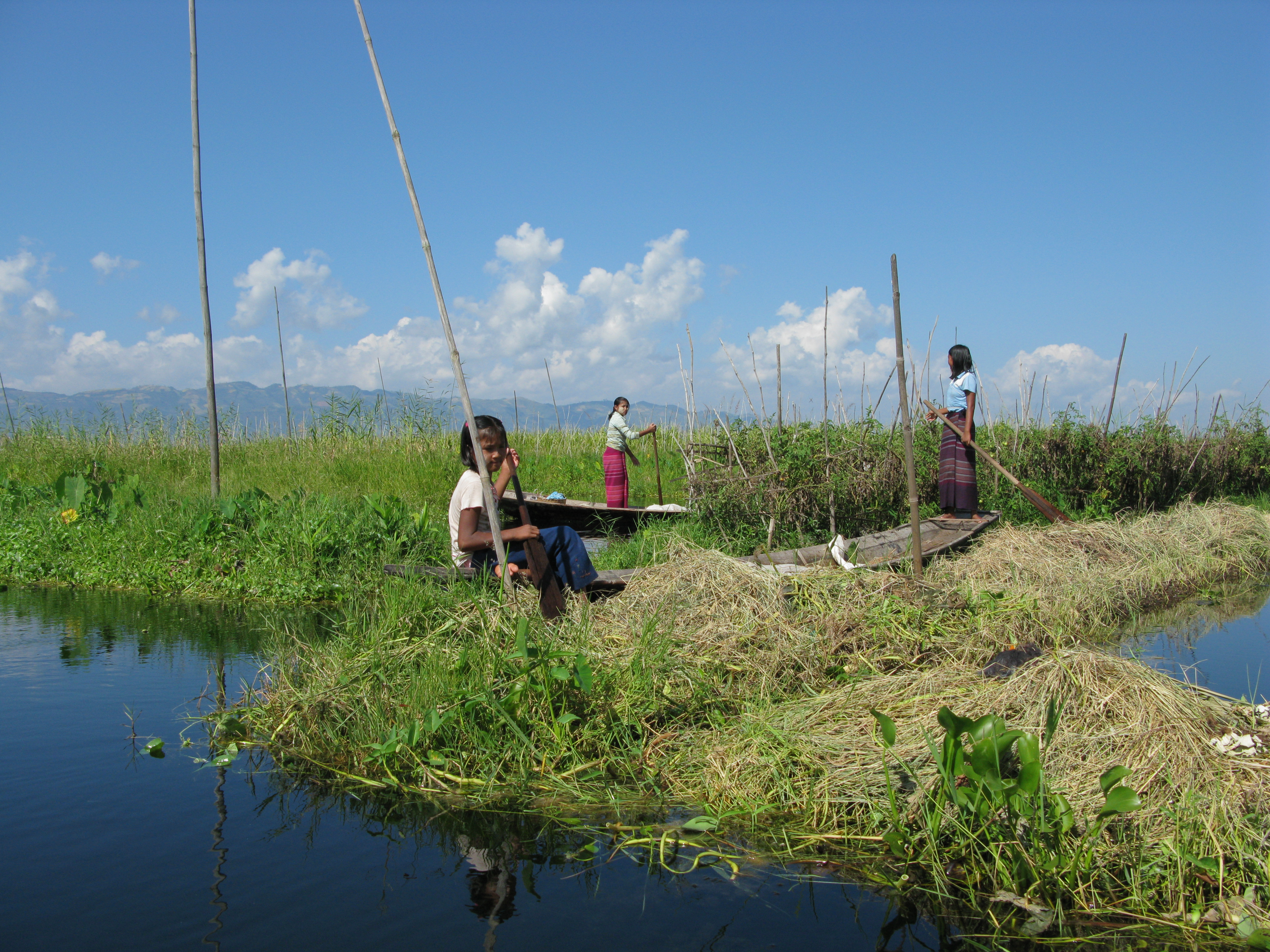
- Floating gardens on Inle Lake

Total population
- 215,800 (2020)

Regions with significant populations
- Shan State: 170,000

Languages
- Intha dialect of the Burmese language

Religion
- Theravada Buddhism

Related ethnic groups
- Bamar, Arakanese

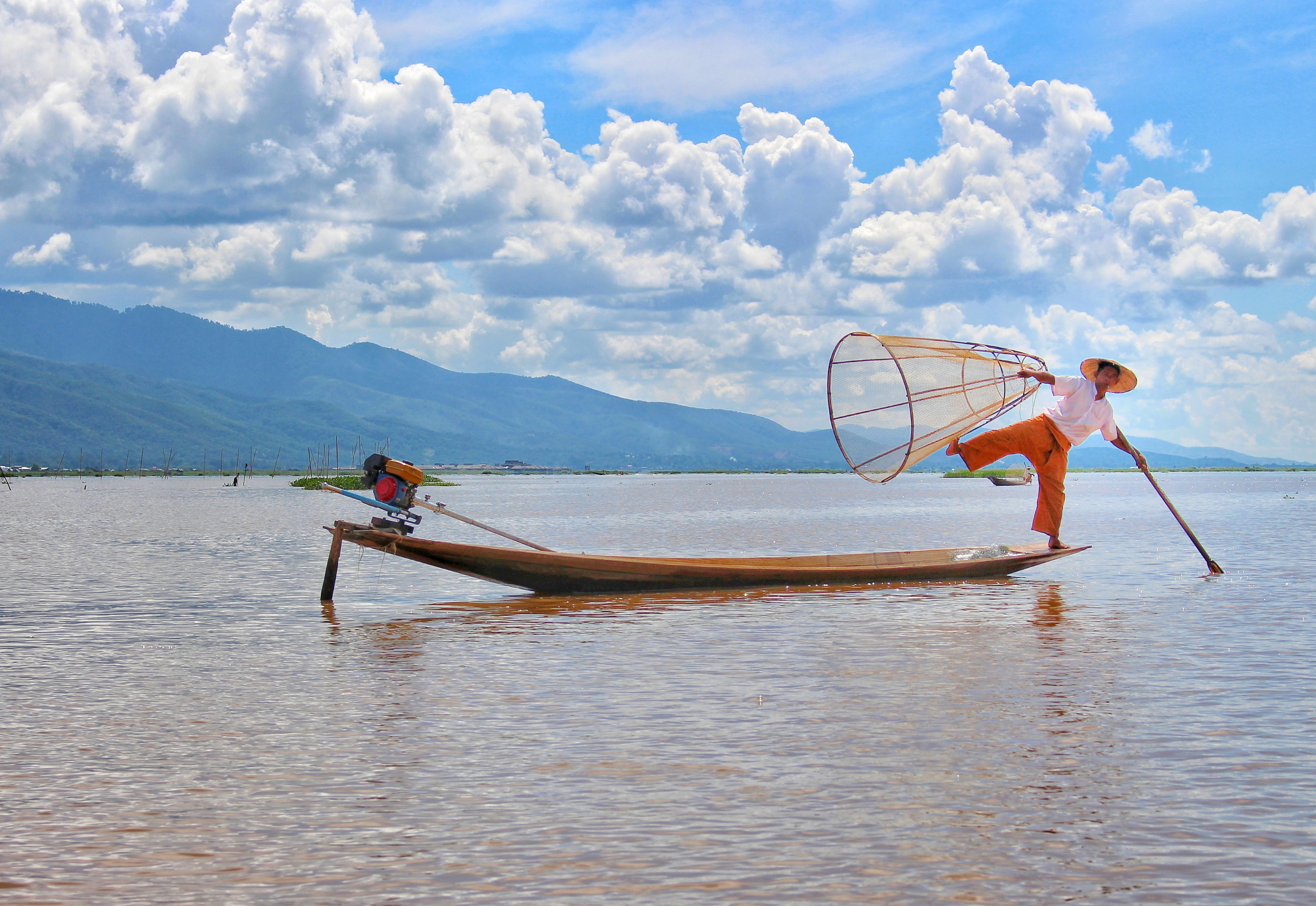
Inle Lake with its leg-rowing Intha people is a major tourist destination in Burma (Myanmar).

The Intha (Burmese: အင်းသားလူမျိုး, MLCTS: ang: sa: lu. myui:, IPA: [ɪ́ɰ̃ðá lùmjóʊ]; lit. 'sons of the lake', also called Insar and Innsar) are members of a Tibeto-Burman ethnic group living around Inle Lake. There are around 215,800 Insar.

== Origins ==
The origins of the Insar are disputed; the Insar believe their ancestors arrived from the southern tip of modern-day Myanmar (Tanintharyi Region). A commonly held theory is that the Insar fled from southern Myanmar during the 14th century; the ruling Shan saophas forbade them from settling on the land, which forced the Insar to instead settle on Inle Lake. To this day, the Insar primarily live in four cities bordering the lake, in numerous small villages along the lake's shores, and on the lake itself. The entire lake area is in Nyaungshwe Township.

== Language ==
The Insar speak a divergent dialect of Burmese. Colonial observers noted that the Insar spoke a language resembling Burmese, with a Shan accent. Unlike other dialects of Burmese, the Insar language does not exhibit voicing sandhi, similar to the Danu and Taungyo languages.

== Culture and religion ==
Insar are overwhelmingly Buddhists, though there is a small Christian sect. They live in simple houses of wood and woven bamboo on stilts; they are largely self-sufficient farmers. The Insar support themselves through the tending of vegetable farms on floating gardens.

Traditional Insar attire consists of a pink-colored short sleeved jacket and loose trousers for men. During the pre-colonial era, Insar women wore tailored cotton jackets called "chin in" over a penny cloth white upper garment, and a satin and silk htamein decorated in alternating shades of light and dark pink stripes and waves. The Insar village of Ywama is home to an indigenous type of longyi called "hat yar," which is sewn with silk and cotton fabric in varying brown and yellow stripes.

Insar cuisine is known for its diversity of bitter soups called saykha hin (ဆေးခါးဟင်း). The traditional beverage of choice, brewed green tea, is served with salt. Traditional meals consist of cooked rice and an array of curries served in a daunglan.

Traditional Insar dances include the lansi, lunsi, and ozigyi dances. Poem recitation traditions called taiktay, in which Intha bachelors and maidens recite poetry.

The Insar are also well known for their unusual leg-rowing techniques. Most transportation on the lake is traditionally by small boats, or by somewhat larger boats fitted with 'long-tail' motors that are necessary because of the usual shallowness of the lake. Local fishermen are known for practicing a distinctive rowing style, which involves standing at the stern on one leg and wrapping the other leg around the oar. This unique style evolved for the reason that the lake is covered by reeds and floating plants, making it difficult to see above them while sitting. Standing provides the rower with a view beyond the reeds. However, the leg rowing style is only practiced by men. Women row in the customary style, using the oar with their hands, sitting cross-legged at the stern.
