= Tavoyan dialects =

Dialect of southern Myanmar

Tavoyan
- Dawei
- ထားဝယ်စကား
- Region: Southeast
- Ethnicity: Dawei
- Native speakers: (ca. 1.1 M cited 2000)
- Language family: Sino-Tibetan: (Tibeto-Burman); Lolo–Burmese; Burmish; Southern; Burmese; Tavoyan

Language codes
- ISO 639-3: Either: tvn – Tavoyan proper tco – Dawei (Tavoyan)
- Glottolog: tavo1242 Tavoyan taun1248 Tavoyan

Tavoyan or Dawei (ထားဝယ်စကား, abbreviated ဝယ်စကား) is a divergent dialect of Burmese is spoken in Dawei (Tavoy), in the coastal Tanintharyi Region of southern Myanmar (Burma). Tavoyan speakers self-identify as Bamar, and are classified by the Burmese government as a subgroup of the Bamar. Approximately 400,000 people speak Tavoyan. Burmese speakers further south speak the Palaw and Myeik dialects. Tavoyan and Burmese have 87% lexical similarity.

Distinct phonological features of Tavoyan have been strengthened by language contact with the Karenic languages. Tavoyan prosody is markedly different from Standard Burmese, especially with respect to rhythm and intonation. Similar to Karen speakers, Tavoyan speakers do not draw out their vowels like Standard Burmese speakers. Tavoyan retains an /-l-/ medial that has since merged into the /-j-/ medial in standard Burmese. Also, voicing can only occur with unaspirated consonants in Tavoyan, whereas in standard Burmese, voicing can occur with both aspirated and unaspirated consonants.

Also, Tavoyan has many loan words from Malay and Thai not found in Standard Burmese. In the Tavoyan dialect, terms of endearment, as well as family terms, are considerably different from Standard Burmese.

== History ==
According to Michael Aung-Thwin, the Tavoyan dialect of Burmese preserved the "spelling (and presumably pronunciation)" of the Old Burmese from the Bagan era. As a result, he suggests that it diverged from other Burmese varieties sometime after the Burmese settlement of Lower Burma under the Bagan era, between the 11th and 13th centuries. He attributes this divergence to a migration of Mon speakers into the area north of Dawei in the late 13th century, which would have cut off Dawei from the main Burmese speaking areas. To this day, the Bamar are called gantha (ဂံသား, lit. 'children of Pagan') in Tavoyan.

== Phonology ==
=== Medials ===
Tavoyan has preserved the /-l-/ medial, which is only extant to Old Burmese, which was likely strengthened through language contact with the Karenic languages, which also feature this medial. Tavoyan can form the following consonant clusters: /ɡl-/, /kl-/, /kʰl-/, /bl-/, /pl-/, /pʰl-/, /ml-/, /m̥l-/. Examples include:

မ္လေ (/mlè/ → Standard Burmese /mjè/) for "ground"

က္လောင်း (/kláʊɴ/ → Standard Burmese /tʃáʊɴ/) for "school"

က္လ (/kla̰/ → Standard Burmese /tʃa̰/) for "ground"

=== Nasalisation ===
In Standard Burmese, the final nasals /-ŋ, -n, -m/ have merged into a nasal vowel. Nasalisation is even weaker in Tavoyan (similar to Myeik), and disappears altogether for some words:

နောင် (/nàʊ/ → Standard Burmese /nàʊɰ̃/) for "elder brother"

=== Phonemes ===
Tavoyan possesses a 'voiced glottal fricative' /ɦ/ that does not exist in Standard Burmese. The phoneme appears in functor particles:

က (/ɦa̰/ → Standard Burmese /ga̰/) for the subject marker
ကို (/ɦò/ → Standard Burmese /gò/) for the subject marker

=== Rhymes ===
The following is a list of rhyme correspondences unique to the Tavoyan dialect

Written Burmese	Standard Burmese	Tavoyan dialect	Notes
-င် -န် -မ်	/-ɪɴ -aɴ -aɴ/	/-aɴ/	
-ဉ် -ျင်	/-ɪɴ -jɪɴ/	/-ɪɴ -jɪɴ/	
ောင်	/-aʊɴ/	/-ɔɴ/	
ုန်	/-oʊɴ/	/-uːɴ/	
ုမ်	/-oʊɴ/	/-aoɴ/	
ိမ်	/-eɪɴ/	/-iːɴ/	
ုတ်	/-oʊʔ/	/-ṵ/	
ုပ်	/-oʊʔ/	/-aoʔ/	
-က် -တ် -ပ်	/-ɛʔ -aʔ -aʔ/	/-aʔ/	
-ိတ် -ိပ်	/-eɪʔ/	/-ḭ/	
-ည်	/-ɛ, -e, -i//	/-ɛ/	
-စ် -ျက်	/-ɪʔ -jɛʔ/	/-ɪʔ -jɪʔ/	
ေွ	/-we/	/-i/	ေ is pronounced as in standard Burmese

Rhymes
Open syllables	weak = ə full = i, e, ɛ, a, ɔ, o, u
Closed syllables	nasal = iːɴ, ɪɴ, aɪɴ, an, ɔɴ, ʊɴ, uːɴ, aoɴ stop = ɪʔ, aɪʔ, aʔ, ɔʔ, ʊʔ, aoʔ

== Vocabulary ==
Due to language contact with Malay and Thai, Tavoyan vocabulary has adopted many loanwords that are not otherwise present in standard Burmese. Certain lexical terms, such as kinship terms, differ from standard Burmese.

Gloss	Tavoyan	Standard Burmese	Source
'goat'	ဘဲ့ bê	ဆိတ် hseit	Mon /həbeˀ/ (ဗၜေံ) or Thai /pʰɛ́ʔ/ (แพะ)
'axe'	ကတ်ပ katpa	ပုဆိန် pasein	Malay kapak
'grandfather'	ဖအို (/pʰa̰ʔò/)	အဖိုး apho	Tavoyan prefers the Burmese augmentative အို
'grandfather'	မိအို (/mḭʔò/)	အဖွား aphwa	Tavoyan prefers the Burmese augmentative အို
'son'	ဖစု (/pʰa̰sṵ/)	သား tha	Tavoyan prefers the Burmese diminutive စု
'daughter'	မိစု (/mḭsṵ/)	သမီး thami	Tavoyan prefers the Burmese diminutive စု
honorific for younger males	နောင် naung	မောင် maung	နောင် refers to the elder brother (of a male) in standard Burmese
