= Pronoun avoidance =

Phenomenon in some spoken languages

Pronoun avoidance is the use of kinship terms, titles and other complex nominal expressions instead of personal pronouns in speech.

== Linguistics ==
Many languages feature the T–V distinction, where two or more different pronouns are used contextually to convey formality or familiarity. In contrast, languages with pronoun avoidance tend to feature complex systems of honorifics and use pronoun avoidance as a form of negative politeness, instead employing expressions referring to status, relationship or title. In these languages, second person pronouns still exist, but are used primarily to address social equals and inferiors.

Languages with pronoun avoidance cluster in East and South-East Asia. For example, in Indonesian, the standard terms of respectful forms of address are Bapak (literally "father") and Ibu ("mother") for men and women respectively, and the neologism Anda was invented in the 1950s to function as a polite second-person pronoun. Japanese, well known for its elaborate system of honorific speech, also exhibits pronoun avoidance, to such an extent that Maynard suggests that Japanese “lacks a pronominal system”.

Pronoun avoidance may extend to first and third person pronouns as well. In Vietnamese, a set of finely graded kinship terms largely replaces all pronouns, but it is also common particularly for women to refer to themselves by name, and titles are often used for third parties.

As well, there may be sociolects or dialects where pronoun avoidance occurs while more prevalent forms of the language lack it. Many Orthodox Jews, when addressing a rabbi, teacher, or other spiritual authority, will address him with the word "Rebbi" instead of "you." The practice is very old, dating at least to the Talmud, and has been noted in Halachic literature. However, though some English-speaking Jews do this, this practice is absent in English as a whole.

=== Languages featuring pronoun avoidance ===
The World Atlas of Language Structures characterizes the following languages as exhibiting pronoun avoidance:

- Burmese
- Indonesian
- Japanese
- Khmer
- Korean
- Thai
- Vietnamese

== Autism ==
Children with autism-spectrum disorder (ASD) frequently exhibit pronoun reversal or pronoun avoidance, using proper names instead. Since autistic children often have difficulty with pronouns, this phenomenon has been attributed variously to input from adults avoiding pronouns, or abnormalities in how children with ASD experience the self.

== See also ==
- Pro-drop language, where pronouns may be omitted when they can be inferred from context
- T–V distinction
- Pronoun game
