= Intha-Danu language =

Burmish dialect group

Intha-Danu
- Pronunciation: dənuʔ
- Native to: Burma
- Region: Inle Lake, Shan State
- Ethnicity: Intha, Danu
- Native speakers: (ca. 200,000 cited 2000–2007)
- Language family: Sino-Tibetan: (Tibeto-Burman); Lolo–Burmese; Burmish; Southern (see Burmese dialects); Intha-Danu
- Dialects: Danu; Intha

Language codes
- ISO 639-3: Either: dnv – Danu int – Intha
- Glottolog: inth1238

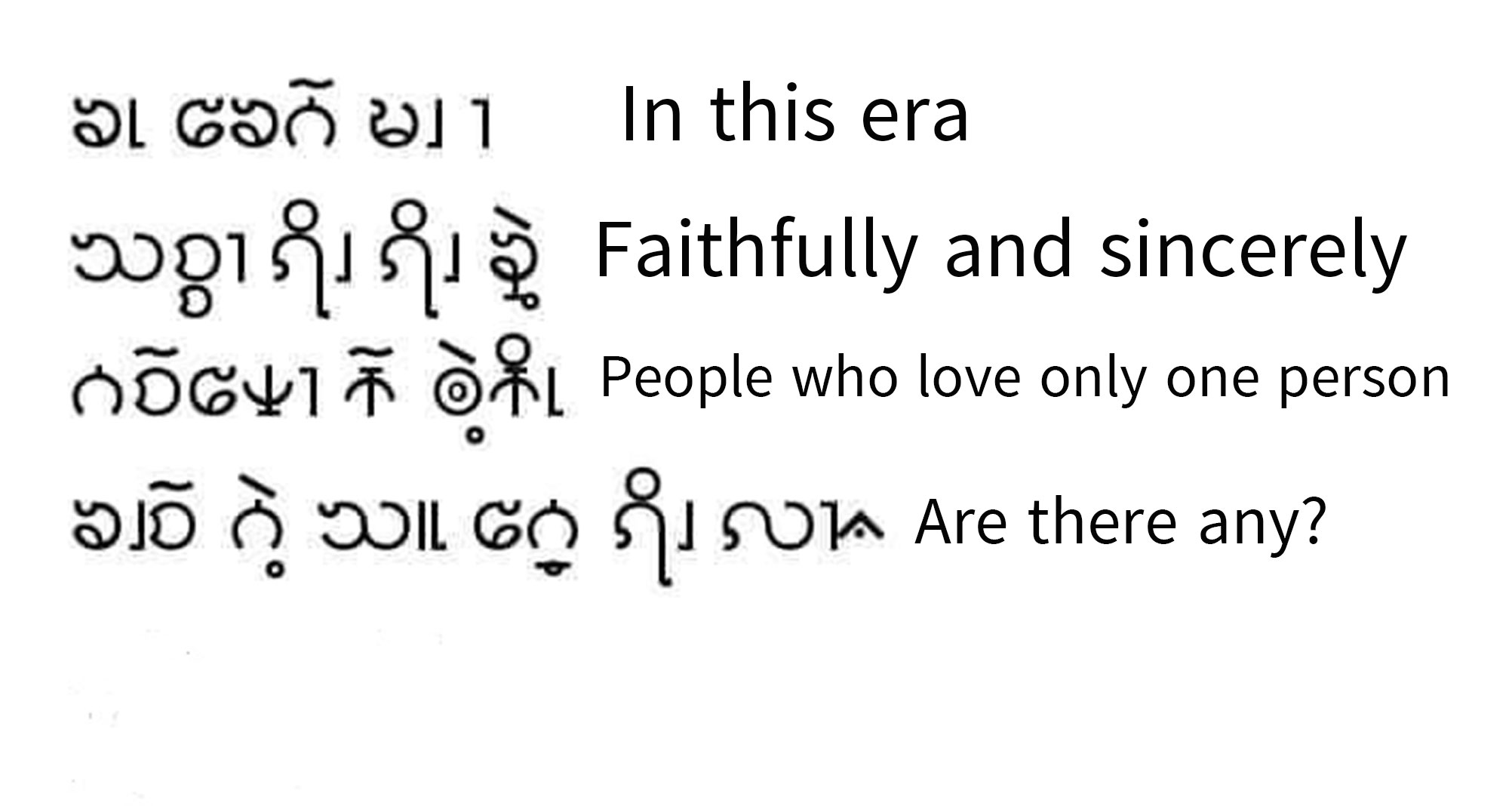

Intha and Danu are southern Burmish languages of Shan State, Burma, spoken respectively by the Intha and Danu people, the latter of whom are Bamar descendants who migrated to Inle Lake in Shan State. Considered to be dialects of Burmese by the Government of Myanmar, Danu has 93% lexical similarity with standard Burmese, while Intha has 95% lexical similarity with standard Burmese. Intha and Danu differ from standard Burmese with respect to pronunciation of certain phonemes, and few hundred local vocabulary terms. Language contact has led to increasing convergence with standard Burmese. Both are spoken by about 100,000 people each.

== Phonology ==
Both Danu and Intha are characterized by retention of the /-l-/ medial (for the following consonant clusters in Intha: /kl- kʰl- pl- pʰl- ml- hml-/). Examples include:*"full": Standard Burmese ပြည့် ([pjḛ]) → ပ္လည့် ([plḛ]), from old Burmese ပ္လည်

- "ground": Standard Burmese မြေ ([mjè]) → မ္လေ ([mlè]), from old Burmese မ္လိယ်

There is no voicing with the presence of either aspirated or unaspirated consonants. For instance, ဗုဒ္ဓ (Buddha) is pronounced [boʊʔda̰] in standard Burmese, but [poʊʔtʰa̰] in Intha. This is likely due to the influence of the Shan language.

Furthermore, သ (/θ/ in standard Burmese) has merged to /sʰ/ (ဆ) in Intha.

== Rhymes ==
Rhyme correspondences to standard Burmese follow these patterns:

Written Burmese	Standard Burmese	Intha	Notes
-ျင် -င်	/-ɪɴ/	/-ɛɴ/	
-ဉ်	/-ɪɴ/	/-ɪɴ/	
ိမ် -ိန် ိုင်	/-eɪɴ -eɪɴ -aɪɴ/	/-eɪɴ/	
-ျက် -က်	/-jɛʔ -ɛʔ/	/-aʔ/	
-တ် -ပ်	/-aʔ/	/-ɛʔ/	
-ည်	/-ɛ, -e, -i/	/-e/	/-i/ if initial is a palatal consonant
ိတ် ိပ် ိုက်	/-eɪʔ -eɪʔ -aɪʔ/	/-aɪʔ/	

Rhymes
Open syllables	weak = ə full = i, e, ɛ, a, ɔ, o, u
Closed	nasal = ɪɴ, eɪɴ, ɛɴ, aɴ, ɔɴ, oʊɴ, ʊɴ stop = ɪʔ, aɪʔ, ɛʔ, aʔ, ɔʔ, oʊʔ, ʊʔ

== Vocabulary ==
Danu has noticeable vocabulary differences from standard Burmese, spanning areas such as kinship terms, food, flora and fauna, and daily objects. For example, the Danu term for 'cat' is mi-nyaw (မိညော်), not kyaung (ကြောင်) as in standard Burmese.

=== Kinship terms ===
Term	Standard Burmese	Danu
Father	အဖေ	အဘ
Grandfather	အဘိုး	ဘကြီး
Grandmother	အဘွား	မေကြီး
Mother	အမေ	အမေ
Stepmother	မိထွေး	အဒေါ်
Elder brother	အစ်ကို	ကိုရင်
Elder sister	အစ်မ	မမ
Brother-in-law	ခဲအို	အနောင်
Uncle	ဦးလေး	အမင်း

== Writing system ==
Danu and Intha are written using the Burmese alphabet.

Between 2013 and 2014, the Taunggyi branch of the Danu Literature and Culture Committee invented a new alphabet to transcribe the Danu language, taking inspiration from both the Pyu and Burmese scripts found on stone inscriptions. Within the Danu Self-Administered Zone (SAZ), adoption of this script remains divisive, with other township branches of the committee and politicians firmly opposed to its usage, arguing that the need for a specific Danu script is unjustified since Danu is a Burmese dialect. The script is currently not accepted by the Danu SAZ's administration. These recent developments have also prompted some actors in the Intha community to invent their own scripts.
