= Old Burmese =

Early form of the Burmese language

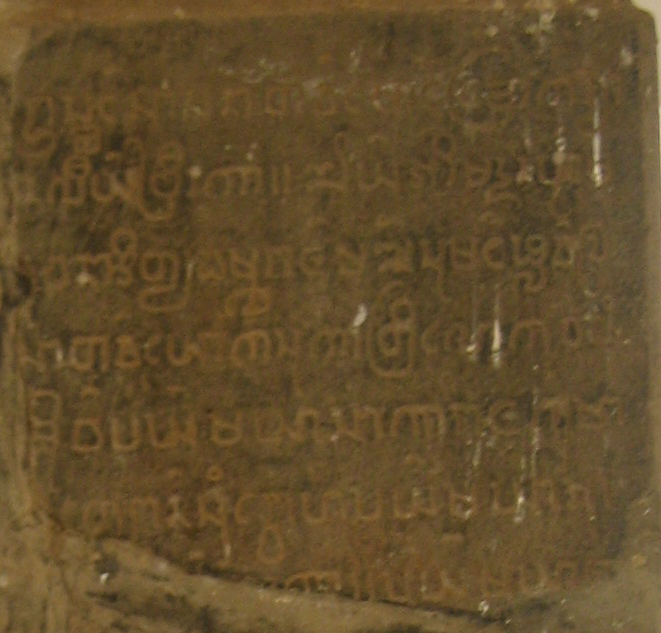
- Detail of the Myazedi inscription
- Region: Pagan Kingdom
- Era: 12th–16th centuries
- Language family: Sino-Tibetan: (Tibeto-Burman); Lolo–Burmese; Burmish; Old Burmese
- Writing system: Burmese script

Language codes
- ISO 639-3: obr
- Glottolog: oldb1235

Old Burmese was an early form of the Burmese language, as attested in the stone inscriptions of Pagan, and is the oldest phase of Burmese linguistic history. The transition to Middle Burmese occurred in the 16th century. The transition to Middle Burmese included phonological changes (e.g. mergers of sound pairs that were distinct in Old Burmese) as well as accompanying changes in the underlying orthography. Word order, grammatical structure and vocabulary have remained markedly comparable, well into Modern Burmese, with the exception of lexical content (e.g. function words).

== Phonology ==
Unlike most Tibeto-Burman languages, Burmese has a phonological system with two-way aspiration: preaspiration (e.g. မှ hma. vs. မ ma.) and postaspiration (e.g. ခ kha. vs. က ka.). In Burmese, this distinction serves to differentiate causative and non-causative verbs of Sino-Tibetan etymology.

In Old Burmese, postaspiration can be reconstructed to the proto-Burmese language, whereas preaspiration is comparatively newer, having derived from proto-prefixes. The merging of proto-prefixes (i.e., ဟ as an independent consonant used as a prefix) to preaspirated consonants was nearly complete by the 12th century.

== Orthography ==
Old Burmese maintains a number of distinctions which are no longer present in the orthography of standard Burmese.

=== Diacritics ===
Whereas Modern Standard Burmese uses 3 written medials (/-y-/, /-w-/, and /-r-/), Old Burmese had a fourth written medial /-l-/, which was typically written as a stacked consonant ္လ underneath the letter being modified.

Old Burmese orthography treated the preaspirated consonant as a separate segment, since a special diacritic (ha hto, ှ) had not yet been innovated. As such, the letter ha (ဟ) was stacked above the consonant being modified (e.g. ဟ္မ where Modern Burmese uses မှ).

=== Gloss ===
Examples of such differences include the consonant yh- and the lateral clusters kl- and khl-. The earliest Old Burmese documents, in particular the Myazedi and Lokatheikpan inscriptions frequently have -o- where later Burmese has -wa. Old Burmese also had a final -at and -an distinct from -ac and -any as shown by Nishi (1974).

Old Burmese	Written Burmese	Example for Old Burmese	Example for Written Burmese
yh-	rh-		
pl-	pr-		
kl-	ky-		
-uy	-we		
-iy	-e		
-o (early OB)	-wa		
ိယ်	‌ေ	ပိယ်	ပေး (to give)
ုယ်	‌ေွ (‌ေွး)	ထုယ်	ထွေး (to spit)
ိုဝ်	ို့	သိုဝ်	သို့ (to)
္လ	ျ/ ြ	က္လောင်း	ကျောင်း/ကြောင်း (school/line)
-ဟ်	ား	သာဟ်	သား (son)
-တ်	-စ်	ဟေတ်	ရှစ် (eight)
ာ	ွ	ကျောန်	ကျွန် (slave)
‌ော	ူ	ဆော	ဆူ (boil)
-ည်	‌ေး	စည်ဝည်	စည်းဝေး (gather)
ဲ	-ယ်	ငဲ	ငယ် (young)
-န်	-ဉ်	အစန်	အစဉ်
-ဝ်	‌ော	စဝ်	စော (early)

== Vocabulary ==
Aside from Pali, the Mon language had significant influence on Old Burmese orthography and vocabulary, as Old Burmese borrowed many lexical items (especially relating to handicrafts, administration, flora and fauna, navigation and architecture), although grammatical influence was minimal. Many Mon loan words are present in Old Burmese inscriptions, including words that were absent in the Burmese vocabulary and those that substituted original Burmese words. Examples include:

- "widow" - Mon ကၟဲာ > Burmese kamay
- "excrement" - Mon ... > Burmese haruk
- "sun" - Mon တ္ၚဲ > Burmese taŋuy

Moreover, Mon influenced Old Burmese orthography, particularly with regard to preference for certain spelling conventions:

- use of -E- (-ဧ-) instead of -Y- (ျ) (e.g. "destroy" ဖဧက်, not ဖျက် as in modern Burmese)
- use of RH- (ဟြ > ရှ) instead of HR- as done with other preaspirated consonants (e.g. "monk" ရှင်, not ဟြင်) - attributed to the fact that Old Mon did not have preaspirated consonants

== Grammar ==
Two grammatical markers presently found in Modern Burmese are extant to Old Burmese:

- ၏ - finite predicate (placed at the end of a sentence)
- ၍ - nonfinite predicate (conjunction that connects two clauses)

In Old Burmese, ၍ was spelt ruy-e(ရုယ်), following the pattern in Pali, whose inflected verbs can express the main predicate.

Pali also had an influence in the construction of written Old Burmese verbal modifiers. Whereas in Modern Burmese, the verb + သော (sau:) construction can only modify the succeeding noun (e.g. ချစ်သောလူ, "man who loves") and သူ (su) can only modify the preceding verb (e.g. ချစ်သူ, "lover"), in Old Burmese, both constructions, verb + သော and verb + သူ were interchangeable. This was a consequence of Pali grammar, which dictates that participles can be used in noun functions.

Pali grammar also influenced negation in written Old Burmese, as many Old Burmese inscriptions adopt the Pali method of negation. In Burmese, negation is accomplished by prefixing a negative particle မ (ma.) to the verb being negated. In Pali, အ (a.) is used instead.

Such grammatical influences from Pali on written Old Burmese had disappeared by the 15th century.

== Pronouns ==
Pronouns in Old Burmese
Pronoun	Old Burmese c. 12th century	Modern Burmese (informal form)	Remarks
I (first person)	ငာ	ငါ	
we (first person)	အတိုဝ့်	ငါတို့ or တို့	Old Burmese တိုဝ့် was a plural marker, now Modern Burmese တို့.
you (second person)	နင်	နင်	
he/she (third person)	အယင်	သူ	

== Surviving inscriptions ==
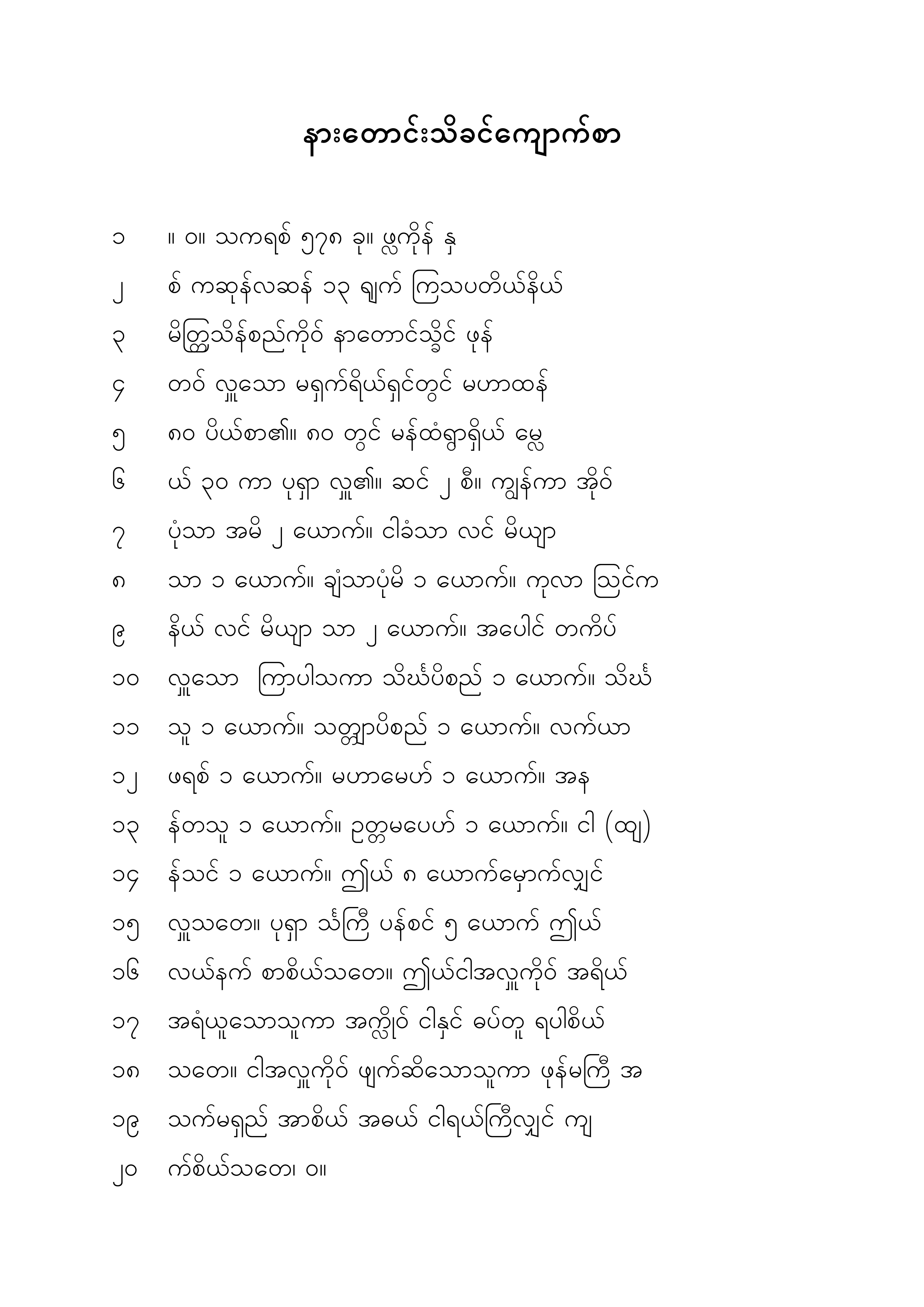
An old Burmese inscription rewritten with modern Burmese script

The earliest evidence of Burmese script (inscription at the Mahabodhi Temple in India) is dated to 1035, while an 18th-century recast stone inscription points to 984. Perhaps the most well known inscription is the Old Burmese face of the Myazedi inscription. The most complete set of Old Burmese inscriptions, called She-haung Myanma Kyauksa Mya (ရှေးဟောင်း မြန်မာ ကျောက်စာများ; lit. "Ancient Stone Inscriptions of Myanmar") was published by Yangon University's Department of Archaeology in five volumes from 1972 to 1987. A digitized version of this collection and a corrected version of the same enhanced with metadata and transliteration are available at Zenodo.
