= Burmese language =

Tibeto-Burman language

Burmese
- Myanmar
- မြန်မာဘာသာစကား
- Pronunciation: [mjàɴmà bàðà zəɡá]
- Native to: Myanmar
- Region: Myanmar; Thailand; China (Dehong); India (Mizoram, Manipur and Tripura); Bangladesh (Chittagong Hill Tracts and Barisal Division)
- Speakers: L1: 33 million (2019); L2: 10 million (no date)
- Language family: Sino-Tibetan: Tibeto-Burman; Lolo-Burmese; Burmish; Burmese
- Early forms: Old Burmese: Middle Burmese
- Writing system: Mon–Burmese script (Burmese alphabet); Burmese Braille

Official status
- Official language in: Myanmar
- Regulated by: Myanmar Language Commission

Language codes
- ISO 639-1: my
- ISO 639-2: bur (B) mya (T)
- ISO 639-3: mya – inclusive code Individual codes: mya – Myanmar int – Intha tco – Taungyo rki – Rakhine rmz – Marma tvn – Tavoyan dialects
- Glottolog: mran1234
- Linguasphere: 77-AAA-a
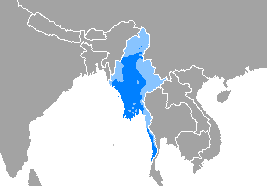
- Areas where Burmese is spoken (dark blue is majority; light blue is minority.)

A man speaking Burmese.

Burmese (Note: Burmese: မြန်မာဘာသာစကား (Burmese pronunciation: [mjàɴmà bàðà zəɡá]); also called ဗမာဘာသာစကား ([bəmà bàðà zəɡá]) or မြန်မာစကား ([mjàɴmà zəɡá])) is a Tibeto-Burman language spoken in Myanmar, where it is the official language, lingua franca, and the native language of the Bamar, the country's largest ethnic group. The Constitution of Myanmar officially refers to it as the Myanmar language in English, though most English speakers continue to refer to the language as Burmese, after Burma—a name with co-official status until 1989 (see Names of Myanmar). Burmese is the most widely spoken language in the country. In 2019, Burmese was spoken by 42.9 million people globally, including by 32.9 million speakers as a first language and 10 million as a second language. A 2023 World Bank survey found that 80% of the country's population speaks Burmese. Burmese dialects are also spoken by some of the indigenous tribes in Bangladesh's Chittagong Hill Tracts, China's Yunnan province, and India's northeastern states, as well as by Burmese diaspora.

Burmese is a tonal, pitch-register, and syllable-timed language, largely monosyllabic and agglutinative with a subject–object–verb word order. Burmese is distinguished from other major Southeast Asian languages by its extensive case marking system and rich morphological inventory. It is a member of the Lolo-Burmese grouping of the Sino-Tibetan language family. The Burmese alphabet ultimately descends from a Brahmic script, either the Kadamba or Pallava alphabet.

The use of writing systems in Tibeto-Burman languages appears to be very restricted. Burmese is one of four Tibeto-Burman languages with an old written tradition (the other three being Tibetan, Meitei, also called Manipuri, and Newar), in accordance to the Tribhuvan University and the University of Michigan.

== Classification ==
Burmese belongs to the Southern Burmish branch of the Sino-Tibetan languages. It is the most widely spoken of the non-Sinitic Sino-Tibetan languages. Burmese was the fifth Sino-Tibetan language to develop a writing system, after Classical Chinese, Pyu, Old Tibetan, and Tangut.

=== Dialects ===
Most Burmese speakers, who live throughout the Irrawaddy River Valley, use variants of standard Burmese, while a minority speak non-standard dialects found in the peripheral areas of the country. These dialects include:

- Tanintharyi Region: Merguese (Myeik, Beik), Tavoyan (Dawei), and Palaw
- Magway Region: Yaw
- Shan State: Intha, Taungyo, and Danu

Arakanese in Rakhine State and Marma in India are also sometimes considered dialects of Burmese and sometimes separate languages.

Burmese dialects mostly share a common set of tones, consonant clusters, and written script. Several Burmese dialects differ substantially from standard Burmese with respect to vocabulary, lexical particles, and rhymes. Below is a summary of lexical similarity between major Burmese dialects:

Dialects	Burmese	Danu	Intha	Rakhine	Taungyo
Burmese	100%	93%	95%	91%	89%
Danu	93%	100%	93%	85–94%	91%
Intha	95%	93%	100%	90%	89%
Rakhine	91%	85–94%	90%	100%	84–92%
Taungyo	89%	N/A	89%	84–92%	100%
Marma	N/A	N/A	N/A	85%	N/A

==== Irrawaddy River valley ====
Spoken Burmese is remarkably uniform among Burmese speakers, particularly those living in the Irrawaddy valley, all of whom use variants of Standard Burmese. The standard dialect of Burmese (the Mandalay-Yangon dialect continuum) originates from the Irrawaddy River valley. Regional differences between speakers from Upper Burma (e.g., Mandalay dialect), called anya tha (အညာသား) and speakers from Lower Burma (e.g., Yangon dialect), called auk tha (အောက်သား), largely occur in vocabulary, not pronunciation. Minor lexical and rhyme differences exist throughout the Irrawaddy River valley. For instance, for the term ဆွမ်း, "food offering [to a monk]", Lower Burmese speakers use [sʰʊ́ɰ̃] instead of [sʰwáɰ̃], the pronunciation used in Upper Burma.

The standard dialect is typified by the Yangon dialect because of the modern city's media influence and economic clout. Formerly, the Mandalay dialect represented standard Burmese. The Mandalay dialect's most noticeable feature is its continued use of the first-person pronoun ကျွန်တော်, kya.nau [tɕənɔ̀] by both men and women. In Yangon, only male speakers use the same pronoun, while female speakers use ကျွန်မ, kya.ma. [tɕəma̰]. Moreover, with regard to kinship terminology, Upper Burmese speakers differentiate the maternal and paternal sides of a family while Lower Burmese speakers do not.

Mon has also influenced subtle grammatical differences between the varieties of Burmese spoken in Lower and Upper Burma. In Lower Burmese varieties, the verb ပေး ('to give') is colloquially used as a permissive causative marker, as in other Southeast Asian languages, but unlike in most Tibeto-Burman languages. This usage is hardly used in Upper Burmese varieties and is considered sub-standard.

==== Outside the Irrawaddy basin ====
More distinctive nonstandard varieties of Burmese emerge as one moves farther away from the Irrawaddy River valley. These varieties include the Yaw, Palaw, Myeik (Merguese), Tavoyan and Intha dialects. Despite substantial vocabulary and pronunciation differences, there is mutual intelligibility among most Burmese dialects, especially with language convergence.

Dialects in Tanintharyi Region, including Palaw, Merguese, and Tavoyan, are especially conservative compared to Standard Burmese. The Tavoyan and Intha dialects have preserved the /l/ medial, which is only found in Old Burmese inscriptions. These dialects also often reduce the intensity of the glottal stop. Beik has 250,000 speakers and Tavoyan 400,000. The grammatical constructs of Burmese dialects in Southern Myanmar show greater Mon influence than Standard Burmese.

The most pronounced feature of the Arakanese language of Rakhine State is its retention of the [ɹ] sound, which has become [j] in standard Burmese. Moreover, Arakanese features a variety of vowel differences, including the merger of the ဧ [e] and ဣ [i] vowels. Hence, a word like "blood" သွေး is pronounced [θwé] in standard Burmese and [θwí] in Arakanese.

== History ==
The Burmese language's early forms include Old Burmese and Middle Burmese. Old Burmese dates from the 11th to the 16th century (Pagan to Ava dynasties); Middle Burmese from the 16th to the 18th century (Toungoo to early Konbaung dynasties); modern Burmese from the mid-18th century. Burmese phonology has evolved significantly, but word order, grammatical structure, and vocabulary have remained markedly stable well into Modern Burmese, with the exception of lexical content (e.g., function words).

=== Old Burmese ===
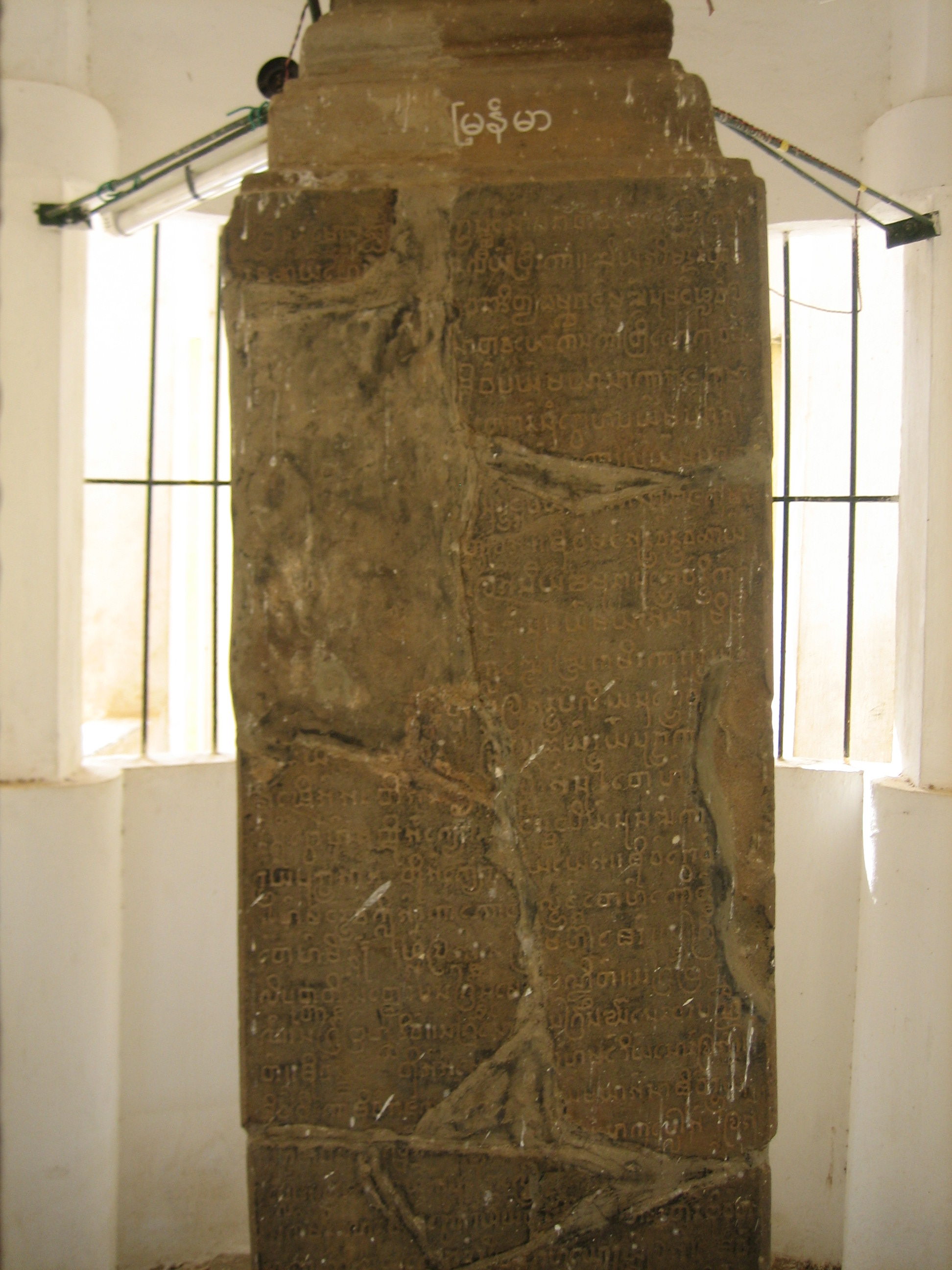
The Myazedi inscription, dated to AD 1113, is the oldest surviving stone inscription of the Burmese language.

The earliest attested form of the Burmese language is Old Burmese, dating to the 11th- and 12th-century stone inscriptions of Pagan. The earliest evidence of the Burmese alphabet dates to 1035, while a casting made in the 18th century of an old stone inscription points to 984.

Owing to the linguistic prestige of Old Pyu in the Pagan Kingdom era, Old Burmese borrowed a substantial corpus of vocabulary from Pali via the Pyu language. These indirect borrowings can be traced to orthographic idiosyncrasies in these loanwords, such as the Burmese word "to worship", which is spelt ပူဇော် (pūjo) instead of ပူဇာ (pūjā), as would be expected by the original Pali orthography.

In the mid-15th century, bilingual Pali-Burmese texts called nissaya (နိဿယ) emerged. They played a significant role in shaping the standard language, leading Burmese postpositional markers to be reinterpreted as equivalents of Pali inflections, giving them new grammatical roles that were compatible with their original use but not inherent to them. Over time, these markers became integral to the morphological structure of Burmese and were seen as more obligatory in literary Burmese than in colloquial Burmese.

=== Middle Burmese ===
The transition to Middle Burmese occurred in the 16th century. The transition included phonological changes (e.g. mergers of sound pairs that were distinct in Old Burmese) as well as accompanying changes in the underlying orthography.

From the 1500s onward, Burmese kingdoms saw substantial gains in the populace's literacy rate, which manifested in greater participation of laymen in scribing and composing legal and historical documents, domains that were traditionally the domain of Buddhist monks, and drove the ensuing proliferation of Burmese literature in both genres and works. During this period, the Burmese alphabet began employing cursive-style circular letters typically used in palm-leaf manuscripts as opposed to the square block-form letters used in earlier periods. The orthographic conventions used in written Burmese today can largely be traced to Middle Burmese.

=== Modern Burmese ===
Modern Burmese emerged in the mid-18th century. By this time, male literacy in Burma stood at nearly 50%, which enabled the wide circulation of legal texts, royal chronicles, and religious texts. A major reason for the Burmese language's uniformity was the near-universal presence of Buddhist monasteries (kyaung) in Burmese villages. These served as the foundation of the pre-colonial monastic education system, which fostered uniformity of the language throughout the Upper Irrawaddy valley, the traditional homeland of Burmese speakers. The 1891 Census of India, conducted five years after the annexation of the entire Konbaung Kingdom, found that the former kingdom had an "unusually high male literacy" rate of 62.5% for Upper Burmans aged 25 and above. For all of British Burma, the literacy rate was 49% for men and 5.5% for women (by contrast, British India more broadly had a male literacy rate of 8.44%).

The expansion of the Burmese language into Lower Burma also coincided with the emergence of Modern Burmese. As late as the mid-1700s, Mon, an Austroasiatic language, was the principal language of Lower Burma, employed by the Mon people who inhabited the region. Lower Burma's shift from Mon to Burmese was accelerated by the Burmese-speaking Konbaung Dynasty's victory over the Mon-speaking Restored Hanthawaddy Kingdom in 1757. By 1830, an estimated 90% of the population in Lower Burma self-identified as Burmese-speaking Bamars; huge swaths of former Mon-speaking territory, from the Irrawaddy Delta to upriver in the north, spanning Bassein (now Pathein) and Rangoon (now Yangon) to Tharrawaddy, Toungoo, Prome (now Pyay), and Henzada (now Hinthada), were now Burmese-speaking. The language shift has been ascribed to a combination of population displacement, intermarriage, and voluntary changes in self-identification among increasingly Mon–Burmese bilingual populations in the region.

Standardized tone marking in written Burmese was not achieved until the 18th century. From the 19th century onward, orthographers created spellers to reform Burmese spelling because of ambiguities that arose over transcribing sounds that had merged. British rule saw continued efforts to standardize Burmese spelling through dictionaries and spellers.

Britain's gradual annexation of Burma throughout the 19th century, in addition to concomitant economic and political instability in Upper Burma (e.g., increased tax burdens from the Burmese crown, British rice production incentives, etc.) also accelerated the migration of Burmese speakers from Upper Burma into Lower Burma. British rule in Burma eroded the strategic and economic importance of the Burmese language; Burmese was effectively subordinated to the English language in the colonial educational system, especially in higher education.

In the 1930s, the Burmese language saw a linguistic revival, precipitated by the establishment of an independent University of Rangoon in 1920 and the inception of a Burmese language major at the university by Pe Maung Tin, modeled on Anglo Saxon language studies at the University of Oxford. Student protests in December of that year, triggered by the introduction of English into matriculation examinations, fueled growing demand for Burmese to become the medium of education in British Burma; a short-lived but symbolic parallel system of "national schools" that taught in Burmese subsequently launched. The role and prominence of the Burmese language in public life and institutions was championed by Burmese nationalists, intertwined with their demands for greater autonomy and independence from the British in the leadup to Burmese independence in 1948.

The 1948 Constitution of Burma prescribed Burmese as the official language of the newly independent nation. The Burma Translation Society and Rangoon University's Department of Translation and Publication were established in 1947 and 1948, respectively, with the joint goal to modernize the Burmese language in order to replace English across all disciplines. Anti-colonial sentiment throughout the early post-independence era led to a reactionary switch from English to Burmese as the national medium of education, a process accelerated by the Burmese Way to Socialism. In August 1963, the socialist Union Revolutionary Government established the Literary and Translation Commission (the immediate precursor to the Myanmar Language Commission) to standardize Burmese spelling, diction, composition, and terminology. In 1978, the commission compiled the latest spelling authority, the Myanma Salonpaung Thatpon Kyan (မြန်မာ စာလုံးပေါင်း သတ်ပုံ ကျမ်း).

== Registers ==
=== Diglossia ===
Burmese is a diglossic language with two distinguishable registers (or diglossic varieties):

1. Literary High (H) form (မြန်မာစာ mranma ca): the high variety (formal and written), used in literature (formal writing), newspapers, radio broadcasts, and formal speeches
2. Spoken Low (L) form (မြန်မာစကား mranma ca.ka:): the low variety (informal and spoken), used in daily conversation, television, comics and literature (informal writing)

The literary form of Burmese retains archaic and conservative grammatical structures and modifiers (including affixes and pronouns) no longer used in the colloquial form. Most verbs and some nouns also have longer forms in literary Burmese. Literary Burmese, which has not changed significantly since the 13th century, is the register of Burmese taught in schools. Case marking is highly developed and consistently used in literary Burmese, covering markers for subjects, direct objects, indirect objects, the ablative and locative. Spoken Burmese also uses case markers, but does so less consistently, particularly for subjects and direct object marking. The equivalent affixes used in Literary and Spoken Burmese are totally unrelated to each other. Examples of this phenomenon include the following lexical terms:

Gloss	Literary HIGH	Spoken LOW
"this" (pronoun)	ဤ i	ဒီ di
"that" (pronoun)	ထို htui	ဟို hui
"at" (case)	၌ hnai. [n̥aɪʔ]	မှာ hma [m̥à]
plural (suffix)	များ mya:	တွေ twe
possessive (case)	၏ i.	ရဲ့ re.
"and" (conjunction)	နှင့် hnang.	နဲ့ ne.
"if" (conjunction)	လျှင် hlyang	ရင် rang

Historically the literary register was preferred for written Burmese on the grounds that "the spoken style lacks gravity, authority, dignity". In the mid-1960s, some Burmese writers attempted to abandon the literary form in favor of the spoken vernacular form. Some Burmese linguists, such as Minn Latt, a Czech academic, proposed moving away from the high form of Burmese altogether. The literary form is heavily used in written and official contexts (literary and scholarly works, radio news broadcasts, and novels), but the recent trend has been to accommodate the spoken form in informal written contexts. Nowadays, television news broadcasts, comics, and commercial publications use the spoken form or a combination of the spoken and simpler, less ornate formal forms.

Burmese uses also distinct spoken and written forms for question pronouns. The following examples demonstrate significant differences in the pronouns, verbs, and other markers used between the literary and spoken forms (contrasts in bold):

Literary: မည်သူ က မိမိ ၏ အသက်လမ်းကြောင်း ဆက် ပေး နေ သည့် ခလုတ် ကို ဖြုတ်ချ ကြ မည် နည်း?
Spoken: ဘယ်သူတွေ " ကိုယ့် ရဲ့ " " " " တဲ့ " " ဖြုတ် " မှာ လဲ?
Gloss: who.PL TOP I POS lifeline continue give CONT ADJ plug OBJ pull PL FUT INT
'Who will discontinue my life support?'

Literary: ရှစ်လေးလုံးအရေးအခင်း ဖြစ် သောအခါက လူ ဦးရေ ၃၀၀၀ မျှ သေဆုံး ခဲ့ ကြ သည်။
Spoken: " " တုန်းက " အယောက် " လောက် သေ " " တယ်။
Gloss: {8888 Uprising} occur when people MW 3,000 approximately die-V PAST PL FP
'When the 8888 Uprising took place, approximately 3,000 people died.'

=== Honorific terms ===
Burmese has politeness levels and honorifics that take into account the speaker's status and age in relation to the audience. The suffix ပါ (pa) is frequently used after a verb to express politeness. Moreover, Burmese pronouns relay varying degrees of deference or respect. Polite speech (e.g., addressing teachers, officials, or elders) employs feudal-era third-person pronouns or kinship terms in lieu of first- and second-person pronouns.

Honorific vocabulary is used in Burmese to distinguish Buddhist clergy from the laity (householders), especially when speaking to or about bhikkhus (monks). Distinct honorific vocabulary (often euphemistic) also distinguishes commoners from royals. The honorific markers -တော် (daw) and -တော်မူ (dawmu) are suffixed to nouns and verbs, respectively, in relation to Buddhist clergy and royals. Lexical items from standard Burmese, royal vocabulary, and clerical vocabulary are shown side by side in the table below:

Gloss	Standard	Polite	Religious	Royal
'eat' (verb)	စား ca:	သုံးဆောင် sum: hcaung	ဘုဉ်းပေး bhuny: pe:	ပွဲတော်တည် pwai dau te
'sleep' (verb)	အိပ် ip		ကျိန်း kyin:	စက်တော်ခေါ် cak tau khau
'die' (verb)	သေ se	ကွယ်လွန် kwe lwan	ပျံတော်မူ pyam tau mu	နတ်ရွာစံ nat rwa cam
'father'	အဖေ a hpe	ဖခင် hpa hkang	ခမည်းတော် hka many: tau	
'live, dwell' (verb)	နေ ne	နေထိုင် ne htuing	သီတင်းသုံး sa tin som:	စံမြန်း cam mran:

== Vocabulary ==
Burmese has primarily inherited its monosyllabic vocabulary from Sino-Tibetan stock. The language has also adopted polysyllabic loanwords from Indo-European languages like Pali and English, as well as sesquisyllabic words from Mon, an Austroasiatic language. Burmese loanwords are overwhelmingly in the form of nouns.

Of the Indo-European languages, Pali, the liturgical language of Theravada Buddhism, had the profoundest influence on enriching the Burmese vocabulary. Burmese has readily adopted words of Pali origin; this may be due to phonotactic similarities between the languages and the Burmese script's inherent ability to reproduce Pali spellings with complete accuracy. Pali loanwords are often related to religion, government, arts, and science. Burmese loanwords from Pali primarily take four forms:

1. Direct loan: direct import of Pali words with no alteration in orthography
2. Abbreviated loan: import of Pali words with accompanied syllable reduction and alteration in orthography, usually by means of a placing a diacritic, called athat အသတ် (llit. 'nonexistence') atop the last letter in the syllable to suppress the consonant's inherent vowel
3. Double loan: adoption of two different terms derived from the same Pali word
4. Hybrid loan (e.g., neologisms or calques): construction of compounds combining native Burmese words with Pali or combine Pali words

Category	Gloss	Burmese	Pali
Direct loan	'life'	ဇီဝ jīva	ဇီဝ jīva
Direct loan	'life'	ဘဝ bhava	ဘဝ bhava
Direct loan	'music'	ဂီတ gīta	ဂီတ gīta
Abbreviated loan	'karma'	ကံ kam	ကမ္မ kamma
Abbreviated loan	'dawn'	အရုဏ် aruṇ	အရုဏ aruṇa
Abbreviated loan	'merit'	ကုသိုလ် kusuil	ကုသလ kusala
Double loan	'arrogance'	မာန māna	မာန māna
Double loan	'pride'	မာန် mān	မာန māna
Double loan	'strength'	ဗလ bala	ဗလ bala
Double loan	'leader'	ဗိုလ် buil	ဗလ bala
Hybrid loan	'airplane'	လေယာဉ်ပျံ leyāñpyaṃ	ယာဉ် (from yāna, 'vehicle')
Hybrid loan	'name'	နာမည် nāmaññ	နာမ (from nāma, 'name')

Burmese has also adapted numerous words from Mon, traditionally spoken by the Mon people of Lower Burma. Most Mon loanwords are so well assimilated that they are not distinguished as loanwords, as Burmese and Mon were used interchangeably for several centuries in pre-colonial Burma. Mon loans often relate to flora, fauna, administration, textiles, foods, boats, crafts, architecture, and music.

As a natural consequence of British rule in Burma, English has been another major source of vocabulary, especially with regard to technology, measurements, and modern institutions. English loanwords tend to take one of three forms:

1. Direct loan: adoption of an English word, adapted to the Burmese phonology
  - "democracy": English democracy → Burmese ဒီမိုကရေစီ
2. Neologism or calque: translation of an English word using native Burmese constituent words
  - "human rights": English 'human rights' → Burmese လူ့အခွင့်အရေး (လူ့ 'human' + အခွင့်အရေး 'rights')
3. Hybrid loan: construction of compound words by joining native Burmese words to English words
  - 'to sign': ဆိုင်းထိုး [sʰã́ɪ̃ tʰó] ← ဆိုင်း (English, sign) + ထိုး (native Burmese, 'inscribe').

To a lesser extent, Burmese has also imported words from Sanskrit (religion), Hindi (food, administration, and shipping), and Chinese (games and food). Burmese has also imported a handful of words from other European languages such as Portuguese.

Here is a sample of loan words found in Burmese:

Gloss	Burmese	Source
'suffering'	ဒုက္ခ [dowʔkʰa̰]	Pali dukkha
'radio'	ရေဒီယို [ɹèdìjò]	English radio
'crab'	ကဏန်း [ɡənáɴ]	Mon ဂတာံ
'flatter'	ဖော်လံဖား [pʰɔ̀làɴpʰá]	Hokkien 扶𡳞脬 (phô͘-lān-pha)
'wife'	ဇနီး [zəní]	Sanskrit जनी (janī)
'noodle'	ခေါက်ဆွဲ [kʰaʊʔ sʰwɛ́]	Shan ၶဝ်ႈသွႆး [kʰāu sʰɔi]
'foot' (unit)	ပေ [pè]	Portuguese pé
'flag'	အလံ [əlã̀]	Arabic: علم ʿalam
'storeroom'	ဂိုဒေါင် [ɡòdã̀ʊ̃]	Malay gudang

Since the end of British rule, the Burmese government has attempted to limit usage of Western loans (especially from English) by coining new words (neologisms). For instance, for the word "television", Burmese publications are mandated to use the term ရုပ်မြင်သံကြား (lit. 'see picture, hear sound') in lieu of တယ်လီဗီးရှင်း, a direct English transliteration. Another example is the word "vehicle", which is officially ယာဉ် [jɪ̃̀] (derived from Pali) but ကား [ká] (from English car) in spoken Burmese. Some previously common English loanwords have fallen out of use with the adoption of indigenous neologisms. An example is the word "university", formerly ယူနီဗာစတီ [jùnìbàsətì], from English university, now တက္ကသိုလ် [tɛʔkət̪ò], a Pali-derived neologism created by the Burmese government and derived from the Pali spelling of Taxila (တက္ကသီလ Takkasīla), an ancient university town in modern-day Pakistan.

Some Burmese words have many synonyms, each with specific usages, such as formal, literary, colloquial, and poetic. An example is the word "moon", which can be လ la̰ (native Tibeto-Burman), စန္ဒာ/စန်း [sàndà]/[sã́] (derivatives of Pali canda 'moon'), or သော်တာ [t̪ɔ̀ dà] (Sanskrit).

== Phonology ==
=== Consonants ===
The consonants of Burmese are as follows:

Consonant phonemes
		Bilabial	Dental	Alveolar	Post-al./ Palatal	Velar	Laryngeal
Nasal	voiced	m		n	ɲ	ŋ	
Nasal	voiceless	m̥		n̥	ɲ̊	ŋ̊	
Stop/ Affricate	voiced	b		d	dʒ	ɡ	
Stop/ Affricate	voiceless	p		t	tʃ	k	ʔ
Stop/ Affricate	aspirated	pʰ		tʰ	tʃʰ	kʰ	
Fricative	voiced		ð ([d̪ð~d̪])	z			
Fricative	voiceless		θ ([t̪θ~t̪])	s	ʃ		
Fricative	aspirated			sʰ			h
Approximant	voiced			l	j	w	
Approximant	voiceless			l̥		ʍ	

According to Jenny & San San Hnin Tun (2016:15), contrary to their use of symbols θ and ð, consonants of သ are dental stops (/t̪, d̪/), rather than fricatives (/θ, ð/) or affricates. These phonemes, alongside /sʰ/, are prone to merger with /t, d, s/.

An alveolar /ɹ/ can occur as an alternative of /j/ in some loanwords.

The final nasal /ɰ̃/ is the value of the four native final nasals: ⟨မ်⟩ /m/, ⟨န်⟩ /n/, ⟨ဉ်⟩ /ɲ/, ⟨င်⟩ /ŋ/, as well as the retroflex ⟨ဏ⟩ /ɳ/ (used in Pali loans) and nasalisation mark anusvara demonstrated here above ka (က → ကံ) which most often stands in for a homorganic nasal word medially as in တံခါး tankhá 'door', and တံတား tantá 'bridge', or else replaces final -m ⟨မ်⟩ in both Pali and native vocabulary, especially after the OB vowel *u e.g. ငံ ngam 'salty', သုံး thóum ('three; use'), and ဆုံး sóum 'end'. It does not, however, apply to ⟨ည်⟩ which is never realised as a nasal, but rather as an open front vowel [iː] [eː] or [ɛː]. The final nasal is usually realised as nasalisation of the vowel. It may also allophonically appear as a homorganic nasal before stops. For example, in /mòʊɰ̃dáɪɰ̃/ ('storm'), which is pronounced [mõ̀ũndã́ĩ].

=== Vowels ===
The vowels of Burmese are:

Vowel phonemes
	Monophthongs			Diphthongs	
	Front	Central	Back	Front offglide	Back offglide
Close	i		u		
Close-mid	e	ə	o	ei	ou
Open-mid	ɛ	ə	ɔ		
Open		a		ai	au

The monophthongs /e/, /o/, /ə/, /ɛ/ and /ɔ/ occur only in open syllables (those without a syllable coda); the diphthongs /ei/, /ou/, /ai/ and /au/ occur only in closed syllables (those with a syllable coda). /ə/ only occurs in a minor syllable, and is the only vowel that is permitted in a minor syllable (see below).

The close vowels /i/ and /u/ and the close portions of the diphthongs are somewhat mid-centralized ([ɪ, ʊ]) in closed syllables, i.e. before /ɰ̃/ and /ʔ/. Thus နှစ် /n̥iʔ/ ('two') is phonetically [n̥ɪʔ] and ကြောင် /tɕàũ/ ('cat') is phonetically [tɕàʊ̃].

=== Tones ===
Burmese is a tonal language, which means phonemic contrasts can be made on the basis of the tone of a vowel. In Burmese, these contrasts involve not only pitch, but also phonation, intensity (loudness), duration, and vowel quality. Some linguists consider Burmese a pitch-register language like Shanghainese. Spoken Burmese exhibits tone sandhi in the form of a shift from a low to an induced creaky tone, to indicate possession.

There are four contrastive tones in Burmese. In the following table, the tones are shown marked on the vowel /a/ as an example.

Tone	Burmese	IPA (shown on a)	Symbol (shown on a)	Phonation	Duration	Intensity	Pitch
Low	နိမ့်သံ	[aː˧˧˦]	à	modal	medium	low	low, often slightly rising
High	တက်သံ	[aː˥˥˦]	á	sometimes slightly breathy	long	high	high, often with a fall before a pause
Creaky	သက်သံ	[aˀ˥˧]	a̰	tense or creaky, sometimes with lax glottal stop	medium	high	high, often slightly falling
Checked	တိုင်သံ	[ăʔ˥˧]	aʔ	centralized vowel quality, final glottal stop	short	high	high (in citation; can vary in context)

For example, the following words are distinguished from each other only based on tone:

- Low ခါ /kʰà/ "shake"
- High ခါး /kʰá/ "be bitter"
- Creaky ခ /kʰa̰/ "to wait upon; to attend on"
- Checked ခတ် /kʰaʔ/ "to beat; to strike"

In syllables ending with /ɰ̃/, the checked tone is excluded:

- Low ခံ /kʰàɰ̃/ "undergo"
- High ခန်း /kʰáɰ̃/ "dry up (usually a river)"
- Creaky ခန့် /kʰa̰ɰ̃/ "appoint"

In spoken Burmese, some linguists classify two real tones (there are four nominal tones transcribed in written Burmese), "high" (applied to words that terminate with a stop or check, high-rising pitch) and "ordinary" (unchecked and non-glottal words, with falling or lower pitch) that encompass a variety of pitches. The "ordinary" tone consists of a range of pitches. Linguist L. F. Taylor wrote, "conversational rhythm and euphonic intonation possess importance" not found in related tonal languages and "its tonal system is now in an advanced state of decay."

Spoken Burmese exhibits tone sandhi in the form of a shift from a low to an induced creaky tone: to indicate possession and to pronounce low-toned numerals in conjunction with other digits. For the former, this does not occur in literary Burmese, which uses ၏ [ḭ] as postpositional marker for possessive case instead of ရဲ့ [jɛ̰]. Examples include:

ငါ > ငါ့
/ŋà/ > /ŋa̰/
'me' > 'my'

အမေ > အမေ့
/ʔəmè/ > /ʔəmḛ/
'mother' > 'mother's'

ဆယ် > ဆယ့်တစ်
/sʰɛ̀/ > /sʰɛ̰tɪʔ/
'ten' > 'eleven'

=== Syllable structure ===
The syllable structure of Burmese is C(G)V((V)C), which is to say the onset consists of a consonant optionally followed by a glide, and the rime consists of a monophthong alone, a monophthong with a consonant, or a diphthong with a consonant. The only consonants that can stand in the coda are /ʔ/ and /ɰ̃/. Some representative words are:

Structure	Example	IPA	Meaning
CV	မယ်	/mɛ̀/	title for young women
CVC	မက်	/mɛʔ/	'to crave'
CGV	မြေ	/mjè/	'earth'
CGVC	မျက်	/mjɛʔ/	'eye'
CVVC	မောင်	/màʊɰ̃/	term of address for young men
CGVVC	မြောင်း	/mjáʊɰ̃/	'ditch'

A minor syllable has some restrictions:

- It contains /ə/ as its only vowel
- It must be an open syllable (no coda consonant)
- It cannot bear tone
- It has only a simple (C) onset (no glide after the consonant)
- It must not be the final syllable of the word

The Mon language is attributed with the development of frequent sesquisyllabic reduction in Burmese words, a pattern that does not appear in other Burmic languages. Some examples of words containing minor syllables:

- ခလုတ် /kʰə.loʊʔ/ 'switch, button'
- ပလွေ /pə.lwè/ 'flute'
- သရော် /θə.jɔ̀/ 'mock'
- ကလက် /kə.lɛʔ/ 'be wanton'
- ထမင်းရည် /tʰə.mə.jè/ 'rice-water'

== Writing system ==
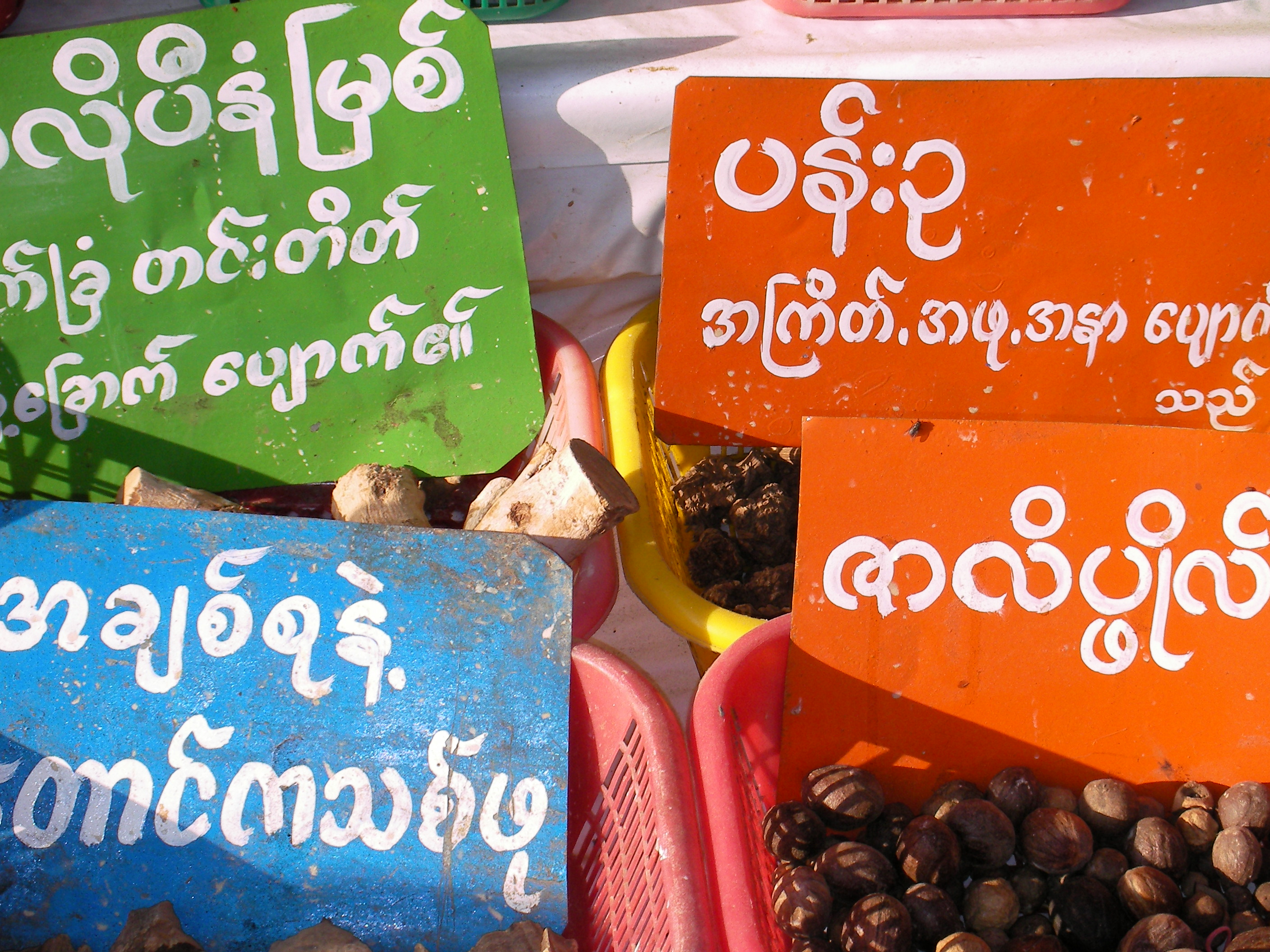
Sampling of various Burmese script styles

The Burmese alphabet consists of 33 letters and 12 vowels and is written from left to right. It requires no spaces between words, although modern writing usually contains spaces after each clause to enhance readability. Characterized by its circular letters and diacritics, the script is an abugida, with all letters having an inherent vowel အ a. [a̰] or [ə]. The consonants are arranged into six consonant groups (called ဝဂ် vag) based on articulation, like other Brahmi scripts. Tone markings and vowel modifications are written as diacritics placed to the left, right, top, and bottom of letters.

Orthographic changes subsequent to shifts in phonology (such as the merging of the [-l-] and [-ɹ-] medials) rather than transformations in Burmese grammatical structure and phonology, which by contrast has remained stable between Old Burmese and modern Burmese. For example, during the Pagan era, the medial [-l-] ္လ was transcribed in writing, which has been replaced by medials [-j-] ျ and [-ɹ-] ြ in modern Burmese (e.g. "school" in old Burmese က္လောင် [klɔŋ] → ကျောင်း [tɕã́ʊ̃] in modern Burmese). Likewise, written Burmese has preserved all nasalized finals [-n, -m, -ŋ], which have merged to [-ɰ̃] in spoken Burmese. (The exception is [-ɲ], which, in spoken Burmese, can be one of many open vowels [i, e, ɛ].) Similarly, other consonantal finals [-s, -p, -t, -k] have been reduced to [-ʔ]. Similar mergers are seen in other Sino-Tibetan languages like Shanghainese and, to a lesser extent, Cantonese.

Written Burmese dates to the early Pagan period. Burmese orthography originally followed a square block format, but the cursive format took hold from the 17th century when increased literacy and the resulting explosion of Burmese literature led to wider use of palm leaves and folded paper known as parabaiks (ပုရပိုက်).

== Grammar ==
The basic word order of the Burmese language in syntactic construction is subject-object-verb. Pronouns vary according to the gender and status of the audience and are often omitted. Affixes are used to convey information. Verbs are almost always suffixed and nouns declined.

In Burmese, words do not always clearly fall into a part of speech. Generally, words are split into nominals, verbs, adverbs and markers.

=== Case affixes ===
Burmese is an agglutinative language with an extensive case system in which nouns are suffixed to determine their syntactic function in a sentence or clause. Sometimes the case markers are different between the two registers.

The case markers are:

	High register	Low register
Subject	thi (သည်), ká (က), hma (မှာ)	ha (ဟာ), ká (က)
Object	ko (ကို)	ko (ကို)
Recipient	à (အား)	ko (ကို)
Allative	thó (သို့)	ko (ကို)
Ablative	hmá (မှ), ká (က)	ká (က)
Locative	hnai (၌), hma (မှာ), twin (တွင်)	hma (မှာ)
Comitative	hnín (နှင့်)	né (နဲ့)
Instrumental	hpyin (ဖြင့်), hnin (နှင့်)	né (နဲ့)
Possessive	í (၏)	yé (ရဲ့)

=== Verbs ===
The roots of Burmese verbs almost always have affixes that convey information like tense, aspect, intention, politeness, mood, etc. Many affixes also have formal/literary and colloquial equivalents. In fact, the only case in which no suffix is attached to a verb is in imperative commands.

==== Property verbs ====
Burmese does not have adjectives per se. Rather, it has verbs that carry the meaning "to be X", where X is equivalent to an English adjective. These verbs, called property verbs, can modify a noun by means of the suffix တဲ့ tai. [dɛ̰] in colloquial Burmese (literary form: သော sau: [t̪ɔ́]), which is suffixed as follows:

Literary: ချော သော လူ
Spoken: ချော တဲ့ လူ
Gloss: beautiful POS person
'beautiful person'

Property verbs may also form a compound with the noun (e.g. လူချော lu hkyau: [lù tɕʰɔ́] 'person' + 'be beautiful') and reduplicated with a verb to form an adverb (e.g. ကောင်ကောင်းသွား kaun kaun thwa: [kàuɰ̃.kàuɰ̃.θwá] meaning "to go well".

Comparatives are usually ordered: X + ထက်ပို htak pui [tʰɛʔ pò] + adjective, where X is the object being compared to. Superlatives are indicated with the prefix အ a. [ʔə] + adjective + ဆုံး hcum: [zṍʊ̃].

=== Nouns ===
Nouns in Burmese are pluralized by suffixing တွေ twe [dwè] (or [twè] if the word ends in a glottal stop) in colloquial Burmese or များ mya: [mjà] in formal Burmese. The suffix တို့ tou. [to̰], which indicates a group of persons or things, is also suffixed to the modified noun. Unlike in English, mass nouns can be modified with plural markers. An example is below:

Literary: မြစ် များ
Spoken: မြစ် တွေ
Both: မြစ် တို့
Gloss: river PL
'rivers'

Plural suffixes are not used when the noun is quantified with a number, instead a measure word or classifier is used.

ကလေး ၅ ယောက်
hka.le: nga: yauk
/kʰəlé ŋá jaʊʔ/
child five CL
"five children"

==== Numerical classifiers ====
Burmese uses numerical classifiers (also called measure words) when nouns are counted or quantified. This is similar to neighboring languages like Thai, Bengali, and Chinese. Measure words are like English expressions such as "two slices of bread" or "a cup of coffee". Classifiers are required when counting nouns, so ကလေး ၅ hka.le: nga: [kʰəlé ŋà] (lit. 'child five') is incorrect, since the measure word for people ယောက် yauk [jaʊʔ] is missing; it must suffix the numeral.

The standard word order of quantified words is: quantified noun + numeral adjective + classifier, except in round numbers (numbers that end in zero), in which the word order is flipped, where the quantified noun precedes the classifier: quantified noun + classifier + numeral adjective. The only exception to this rule is the number 10, which follows the standard word order.

Measurements of time, such as "hour", နာရီ "day", ရက် or "month", လ do not require classifiers.

Below are some of the most commonly used classifiers in Burmese.

Burmese	MLC	IPA	Usage	Remarks
ယောက်	yauk	[jaʊʔ]	for people	Used in informal context
ဦး	u:	[ʔú]	for people	Used in formal context and also used for monks and nuns
ပါး	pa:	[bá]	for people	Used exclusively for monks and nuns of the Buddhist order
ကောင်	kaung	[kã̀ʊ̃]	for animals	
ခု	hku.	[kʰṵ]	general classifier	Used with almost all nouns except for animate objects
လုံး	lum:	[lṍʊ̃]	for round objects	
ပြား	pra:	[pjá]	for flat objects	
စု	cu.	[sṵ]	for groups	Can be [zṵ].

=== Affixes ===
Burmese makes prominent use of affixes (called ပစ္စည်း)—words affixed to words to indicate tense, aspect, case, formality etc. Clausal affixes often indicate various notions that do not directly translate to English, like insistence and emphasis. For example, the affix ဆို [sʰò] conveys the speaker's attitude to the situation, questioning the speaker and can be translated as "didn't you say that...". Affixes also indicate the mood of the clause. For example, စမ်း [sã́] is a suffix used to indicate the imperative mood. While လုပ်ပါ ('work' + suffix indicating politeness) does not indicate the imperative, လုပ်စမ်းပါ ('work' + suffix indicating imperative mood + suffix indicating politeness) does.

Some affixes modify the word's part of speech. Among the most prominent of these is the prefix အ [ə], which is prefixed to verbs to form nouns or adverbs. For instance, the word ဝင် means "to enter", but combined with အ, it means "entrance" အဝင်. Moreover, in colloquial Burmese, there is a tendency to omit the second အ in words that follow the pattern အ + noun/adverb + အ + noun/adverb, like အဆောက်အအုံ, which is pronounced [əsʰaʊʔ ú] and formally pronounced [əsʰaʊʔ əõ̀ʊ̃].

=== Pronouns ===
Burmese exhibits pronoun avoidance. Pronouns are avoided for politeness, with kinship terms, titles, or other forms of address used instead; this is called "negative politeness": speakers avoid directly addressing people. Pronouns account for social distinctions linguistically, reflecting gender, relative age, kinship, social status, and intimacy. Burmese kinship terms are commonly substituted for pronouns. For example, an older person may use ဒေါ်လေး dau le: [dɔ̀ lé] ('aunt') or ဦးလေး u: lei: [ʔú lé] ('uncle') to refer to himself, while a younger person may use either သား sa: [t̪á] ('son') or သမီး sa.mi: [t̪əmí] ('daughter').

Burmese has developed an elaborate hierarchical system of pronouns that are grammatically underspecified, but highly marked for the complex relation between speaker and addressee according to their relative social position. In Burmese, the polite forms of first-person pronouns ကျွန်တော် (kya. nau [tɕənɔ̀], lit. 'royal slave') for males, and ကျွန်မ (kya. ma. [tɕəma̰], lit. 'female slave') for females humble the speaker, while the polite forms of second-person pronouns မင်း (min [mɪ́ɴ]; lit. 'lordship'), ခင်ဗျား (khang bya: [kʰəmjá]; lit. 'master lord') or ရှင် (hrang [ʃɪ̀ɴ]; lit. 'ruler, master') elevate the addressee. The original pronouns ငါ nga [ŋà] ('I/me') and နင် nang [nɪ̃̀] ('you') have been relegated to use with people of higher or equivalent status, although most speakers prefer to use third-person pronouns.

Burmese also uses case markers to mark subject pronouns, although these are generally dropped in spoken Burmese.

The basic pronouns are:

Person	Singular		Plural*	
Person	Informal	Formal	Informal	Formal
First-person	ငါ nga [ŋà]	ကျွန်တော်^{‡} kywan to [tɕənɔ̀] ကျွန်မ^{†} kywan ma. [tɕəma̰]	ငါဒို့ nga tui. [ŋà do̰]	ကျွန်တော်တို့^{‡} kywan to tui. [tɕənɔ̀ do̰] ကျွန်မတို့^{†} kywan ma. tui. [tɕəma̰ do̰]
Second-person	နင် nang [nɪ̃̀] မင်း mang: [mɪ̃́]	ခင်ဗျား^{‡} khang bya: [kʰəmjá] ရှင်^{†} hrang [ʃɪ̃̀]	နင်ဒို့ nang tui. [nɪ̃̀n do̰]	ခင်ဗျားတို့^{‡} khang bya: tui. [kʰəmjá do̰] ရှင်တို့^{†} hrang tui. [ʃɪ̃̀n do̰]
Third-person	သူ su [t̪ù]	(အ)သင် (a.) sang [(ʔə)t̪ɪ̃̀]	သူဒို့ su tui. [t̪ù do̰]	သင်တို့ sang tui. [t̪ɪ̃̀ do̰]

* The basic particle to indicate plurality is တို့ tui., colloquial ဒို့ dui..
^{‡} Used by male speakers.
^{†} Used by female speakers.

Burmese also uses religious personal pronouns, often reserved for speaking with Buddhist monks and nuns with its own set of complexity.

=== Kinship terms ===
Kinship terms vary across Burmese dialects. Upper Burmese dialects still differentiate maternal and paternal sides of a family, unlike Lower Burmese dialects:

Term	Upper Burmese	Lower Burmese	Myeik dialect
Paternal aunt (older); Paternal aunt (younger)	အရီးကြီး [ʔəjí dʑí] (or [jí dʑí]); အရီးလေး [ʔəjí lé] (or [jí lé])	ဒေါ်ကြီး [dɔ̀ dʑí] (or [tɕí tɕí]); ဒေါ်လေး [dɔ̀ lé]	မိကြီး [mḭ dʑí]; မိငယ် [mḭ ŋɛ̀]
Maternal aunt (older); Maternal aunt (younger)	ဒေါ်ကြီး [dɔ̀ dʑí] (or [tɕí tɕí]); ဒေါ်လေး [dɔ̀ lé]	ဒေါ်ကြီး [dɔ̀ dʑí] (or [tɕí tɕí]); ဒေါ်လေး [dɔ̀ lé]	မိကြီး [mḭ dʑí]; မိငယ် [mḭ ŋɛ̀]
Paternal uncle (older); Paternal uncle (younger)	ဘကြီး [ba̰ dʑí]; ဘလေး [ba̰ lé]^{1}	ဘကြီး [ba̰ dʑí]; ဦးလေး [ʔú lé]	ဖကြီး [pʰa̰ dʑí]; ဖငယ် [pʰa̰ ŋɛ̀]
Maternal uncle (older); Maternal uncle (younger)	ဦးကြီး [ʔú dʑí]; ဦးလေး [ʔú lé]	ဘကြီး [ba̰ dʑí]; ဦးလေး [ʔú lé]	ဖကြီး [pʰa̰ dʑí]; ဖငယ် [pʰa̰ ŋɛ̀]

^{1} The youngest (paternal or maternal) aunt may be called ထွေးလေး [dwé lé], and the youngest paternal uncle ဘထွေး [ba̰ dwé].

In a testament to the power of media, the Yangon-based speech is gaining currency even in Upper Burma. Upper Burmese-specific usage, while historically and technically accurate, is increasingly viewed as distinctly rural or regional speech. In fact, some usages are already considered strictly regional Upper Burmese speech and are likely to die out. For example:

Term	Upper Burmese	Standard Burmese
Elder brother (to a male); Elder brother (to a female)	နောင် [nã̀ʊ̃]; အစ်ကို [ʔəkò]	အစ်ကို [ʔəkò]
Younger brother (to a male); Younger brother (to a female)	ညီ [ɲì]; မောင် [mã̀ʊ̃]	
Elder sister (to a male); Elder sister (to a female)	အစ်မ [ʔəma̰]	
Younger sister (to a male); Younger sister (to a female)	နှမ [n̥əma̰]; ညီမ [ɲì ma̰]	ညီမ [ɲì ma̰]

In general, the male-centric names of old Burmese for familial terms have been replaced in standard Burmese with formerly female-centric terms, which are now used by both sexes. One holdover is the use of ညီ ('younger brother to a male') and မောင် ('younger brother to a female'). Terms like နောင် ('elder brother to a male') and နှမ ('younger sister to a male') now are used in standard Burmese only as part of compound words like ညီနောင် ('brothers') or မောင်နှမ ('brother and sister').

=== Reduplication ===
Reduplication is prevalent in Burmese and is used to intensify or weaken property verbs' meanings. For example, if ချော [tɕʰɔ́] "beautiful" is reduplicated, then the intensity of the verb's meaning increases. Many Burmese words, especially verbs with two syllables, such as လှပ [l̥a̰pa̰] "beautiful", when reduplicated (လှပ → လှလှပပ [l̥a̰l̥a̰ pa̰pa̰]) become adverbs. This is also true of some Burmese verbs and nouns (e.g. ခဏ 'a moment' → ခဏခဏ 'frequently'), which become adverbs when reduplicated.

Some nouns are also reduplicated to indicate plurality. For instance, ပြည် [pjì] ('country'), but when reduplicated to အပြည်ပြည် [əpjì pjì], it means "many countries", as in အပြည်ပြည်ဆိုင်ရာ [əpjì pjì sʰã̀ɪ̃ jà] ('international'). Another example is အမျိုး, which means "a kind", but the reduplicated form အမျိုးမျိုး means "multiple kinds".

A few measure words can also be reduplicated to indicate "one or the other":

- ယောက် (measure word for people) → တစ်ယောက်ယောက် ('someone')
- ခု (measure word for things) → တစ်ခုခု ('something')

== Numerals ==
Burmese numerals in various fonts

Burmese digits are traditionally written using a set of numerals unique to the Mon–Burmese script, although Arabic numerals are also used in informal contexts. The cardinal forms of Burmese numerals are primarily inherited from the Proto-Sino-Tibetan language, with some larger numbers like "ten million" borrowed from Sanskrit or Pali. The ordinal forms of primary Burmese numerals are directly borrowed from Pali. Ordinal numbers beyond ten are suffixed မြောက် (lit. 'to raise').

Burmese numerals follow the nouns they modify, with the exception of round numbers, which precede the nouns they modify and are subject to tone sandhi shifts.

== Romanization and transcription ==
Burmese has no official romanization system. There have been attempts to make one, but none have succeeded. Replicating Burmese sounds in Latin script is complicated. The Pali-based transcription system MLC, devised by the Myanmar Language Commission (MLC), transcribes only sounds in formal Burmese and is based on the Burmese alphabet rather than the phonology.

Several colloquial transcription systems have been proposed, none of which is overwhelmingly preferred.

Transcription of Burmese is not standardized, as seen in the varying English transcriptions of Burmese names. For instance, a Burmese personal name like ဝင်း [wɪ̃́] may be variously romanized as Win, Winn, Wyn, or Wynn, while ခိုင် [kʰã̀ɪ̃] may be romanized as Khaing, Khine, or Khain.

== Computer fonts and standard keyboard layout ==
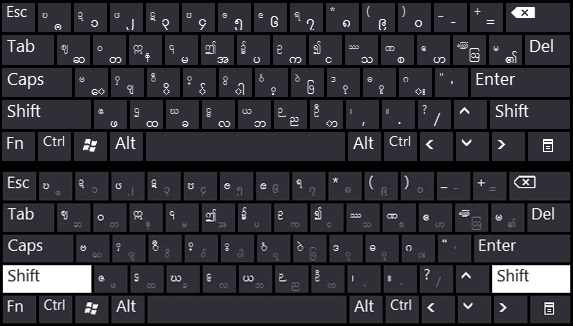
Myanmar3, the de jure standard Burmese keyboard layout

The Burmese alphabet can be entered from a standard QWERTY keyboard and is supported by the Unicode standard, meaning it can be read and written on most modern computers and smartphones.

Burmese has complex character rendering requirements, where tone markings and vowel modifications are noted with diacritics. These can be placed before consonants (as with ေ), above them (as with ိ), or around them (as with ြ). These character clusters are built with multiple keystrokes. In particular, the inconsistent placement of diacritics as a feature of the language presents a conflict between an intuitive WYSIWYG typing approach and a logical consonant-first storage approach.

Since its introduction in 2007, the most popular Burmese font, Zawgyi, has been near-ubiquitous in Myanmar. Linguist Justin Watkins argues that its ubiquitous use harms Myanmar languages, including Burmese, by preventing efficient sorting, searching, processing and analyzing Myanmar text through flexible diacritic ordering.

Zawgyi is not Unicode-compliant, but occupies the same code space as Unicode Myanmar font. As it is not defined as a standard character encoding, Zawgyi is not built into any major operating systems as standard. However, due to its position as the de facto (but largely undocumented) standard within the country, telcos and major smartphone distributors (such as Huawei and Samsung) ship phones with Zawgyi font overwriting standard Unicode-compliant fonts, which are installed on most internationally distributed hardware. Facebook also supports Zawgyi as an additional language encoding for their app and website. As a result, almost all SMS alerts (including those from telcos to their customers), social media posts, and other web resources may be incomprehensible on these devices without the custom Zawgyi font installed at the operating system level. These may include devices purchased overseas or distributed by companies that do not customize software for the local market.

Keyboards with a Zawgyi layout are the most commonly available for purchase domestically.

Until recently, Unicode compliant fonts have been more difficult to type than Zawgyi, as they have a stricter, less forgiving and arguably less intuitive method for ordering diacritics. However, intelligent input software such as Keymagic and recent versions of smartphone soft-keyboards including Gboard and ttKeyboard allow for more forgiving input sequences and Zawgyi keyboard layouts which produce Unicode-compliant text.

A number of Unicode-compliant Burmese fonts exist. The national standard keyboard layout is known as the Myanmar3 layout, and it was published along with the Myanmar3 Unicode font. The layout, developed by the Myanmar Unicode and NLP Research Center, has a smart input system to cover the complex structures of Burmese and related scripts.

In addition to the development of computer fonts and standard keyboard layout, much research remains to be done on Burmese, specifically for Natural Language Processing (NLP) areas like WordNet, Search Engine, development of parallel corpus for Burmese, and development of a formally standardized and dense domain-specific corpus of Burmese.

The Myanmar government has designated 1 October 2019 as "U-Day" to officially switch to Unicode. The full transition is estimated to take two years.

== Example text ==
Article 1 of the Universal Declaration of Human Rights in Burmese:

လူတိုင်းသည် တူညီ လွတ်လပ်သော ဂုဏ်သိက္ခာဖြင့် လည်းကောင်း၊ တူညီလွတ်လပ်သော အခွင့်အရေးများဖြင့် လည်းကောင်း၊ မွေးဖွားလာသူများ ဖြစ်သည်။ ထိုသူတို့၌ ပိုင်းခြား ဝေဖန်တတ်သော ဉာဏ်နှင့် ကျင့်ဝတ် သိတတ်သော စိတ်တို့ရှိကြ၍ ထိုသူတို့သည် အချင်းချင်း မေတ္တာထား၍ ဆက်ဆံကျင့်သုံးသင့်၏။

The romanization of the text into the Latin alphabet:

lutuing:sany tu-nyi lwatlapsau: gun.sikhka.hprang. lany:kaung:| tu-nyi-lwatlapsau: ahkwang.-are:mya:hprang. lany:kaung:| mwe:hpwa:la.su-mya: hpracsany|| htuisutui.hnai puing:hkra: wehpantatsau: nyanhnang. kyang.wat si.tatsau: cittui.hri.kra.rwe htuisutui.sany ahkyang:hkyang: mettahta:rwe hcakhcamkyang.sum:sang.e||

Article 1 of the Universal Declaration of Human Rights in English:

All human beings are born free and equal in dignity and rights. They are endowed with reason and conscience and should act towards one another in a spirit of brotherhood.
