= Aung Myat =

Burmese politician

- အောင်မြတ်

Deputy Speaker Shan State Hluttaw
- Incumbent
- Assumed office 9 February 2016
- Appointed by: President of Myanmar

1st Chief Minister of Shan State
- In office 30 March 2011 – 30 March 2016
- Appointed by: President of Myanmar
- President: Thein Sein
- Preceded by: Office Established
- Succeeded by: Linn Htut

Representative of Shan State Hluttaw
- Incumbent
- Assumed office 8 February 2016
- Constituency: Ywangan Township No. 2

Representative of Shan State Hluttaw
- In office 2011 – 31 January 2016
- Preceded by: Office established
- Succeeded by: Arkar Lin
- Constituency: Pindaya Township No. 1

Personal details
- Born: 14 April 1963 (age 62) Pwela, Pindaya Township, Burma
- Party: Union Solidarity and Development Party
- Spouse: Phyu Phyu Nyunt
- Children: Su Myat Phyu, Aye Myat Phyu, Htet Myat Aung
- Education: Bachelor of Science
- Alma mater: Defense Services Academy
- Cabinet: Shan State Government

Military service
- Branch/service: Myanmar Army
- Rank: Lieutenant-Colonel

Aung Myat (Burmese: အောင်မြတ်) is a Burmese politician and incumbent Deputy Speaker of Shan State Hluttaw. He previously served as Chief Minister of Shan State. Aung Myat is an ethnic Danu.

== Career ==
He is a retired Lieutenant-Colonel in the Myanmar Army, having graduated from the Defense Services Academy with a Bachelor of Science degree. A member of the Union Solidarity and Development Party, he was elected to represent Pindaya Township Constituency No. 1 as a Shan State Hluttaw representative in the 2010 Burmese general election.

== Personal life ==
Aung Myat was born on 14 April 1963 to Nyunt Aung and Khin Kyi, in Pwela, Pindaya Township, Burma. Aung Myat is married to Phyu Phyu Nyunt. They have two daughters and a son; Su Myat Phyu, Aye Myat Phyu, and Htet Myat Aung.
