= Myelat =

Coordinates: 20°57′N 96°40′E

Myelat မြေလတ်
- Historical region
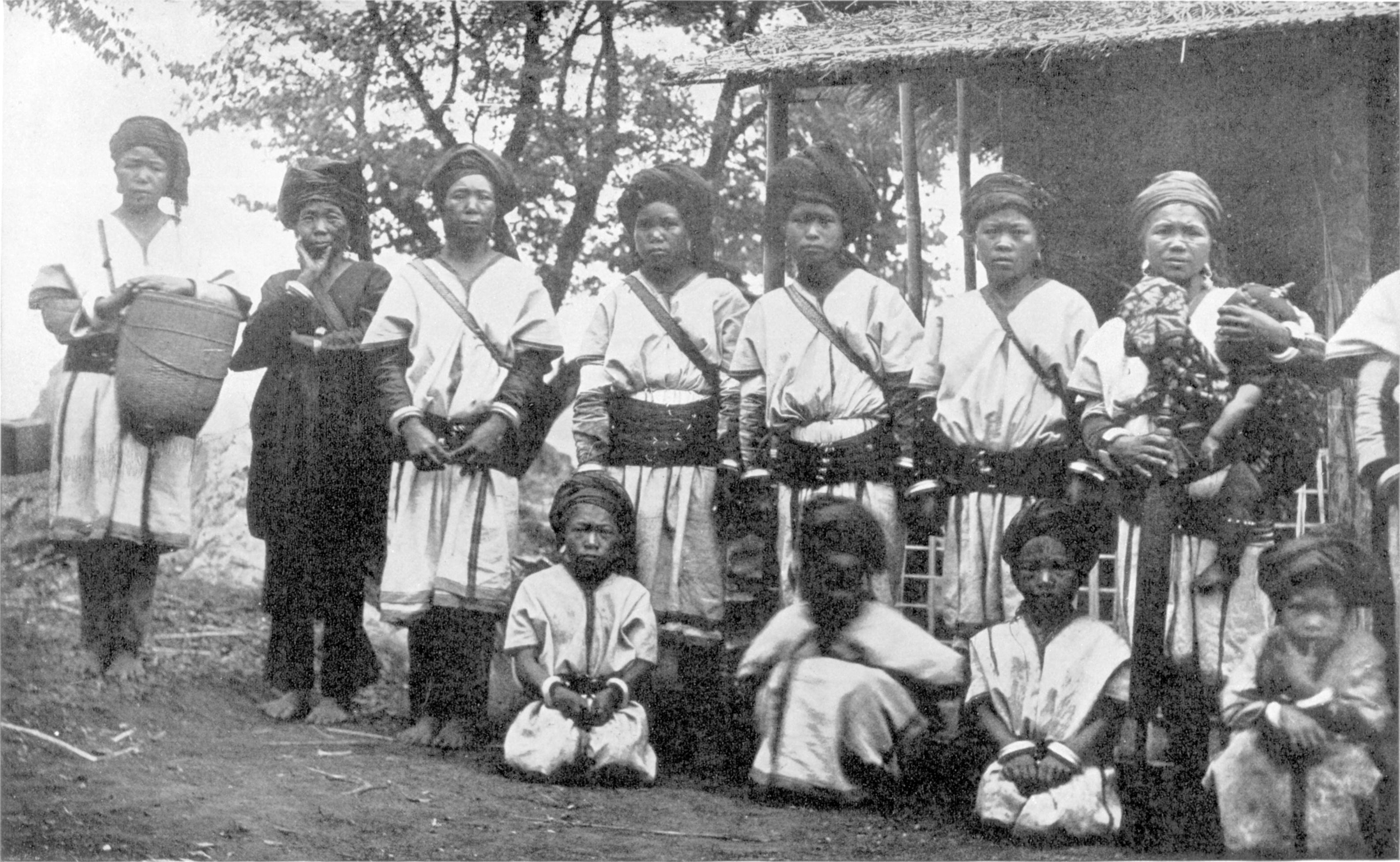
- Picture of people in Myelat taken by Sir George Scott (1851–1935).

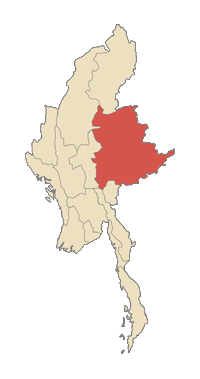
- A map of Shan State
- Country: Myanmar
- Elevation: 880 m (2,890 ft)

Population (1897)
  - Total: 107,500

Myelat (Burmese: ‌မြေလတ်) is a historical region of the southwestern Shan State of Myanmar. Originally this region included some of the smaller states typically ruled by "Myosas" (chief of town) or "Ngwegunhmus" (silver revenue chief), buffering the plains of Burma and the ethnic Shan states further east.

The term "Myelat" is still in common use today, although the old political and administrative distinctions no longer apply.

== Geography ==
The area is hemmed in on the north by the state of Lawksawk, on the east by the states of Yawnghwe, Wanyin and Hsatung, and on the south by Mong Pai.

In 1897, the population was recorded as 107,500, the majority being of the Taungthu or Pa-O (42,933), followed by Danu (29,713), Taungyo (13,906), Shan (6,572), and a smaller number of other ethnic groups.

The name Myelat could be interpreted as "unoccupied land" in Burmese, however the land has been populated for quite some time. The name could also be interpreted as "middle earth", implying a buffer zone, or "fair earth", depending on a variation of the spelling. All central Myelat and great parts of the northern and southern portions consist of rolling grassy downs bare of jungle. The area is productive in agriculture, crops grown include potatoes, corn, wheat, cabbage, cauliflower, oranges, coffee, as well as rice. Visitors to the area immediately notice the red earth of the countryside, due to high iron oxide content of the soil.

== Myelat Division ==
The exact composition of the states within the Myelat area has changed through history, dependent on vagaries of local power politics as well as approval by the Burmese court. At times, states have been combined, at other times, they have been split up.

At the time of the British annexation of the Shan States, the following sixteen states were recognized to be within the Myelat region: Hsamonghkam, Kyawkku Hsiwan, Kyong, Loi-ai, Loilong, Loimaw, Maw, Mawnang, Mawson, Namhkai, Namhkom, Namtok, Pangmi, Pangtara, Poila, and Yengan. The total area of these states was approximately 3,900 square miles (10,000 km^{2}).
