= Hteehlaing (Ywangan) =

Htee Hlaing ထီးလှိုင်ရွာ
- Village
- Hteehlaing Village
- Location in Burma
- Coordinates: 21°18′29″N 96°21′12″E
- Country: Myanmar
- State: Shan State
- District: Danu Self-Administered Zone
- Township: Ywangan Township
- Village tract: Hteehlaing
- Time zone: UTC+6.30 (Burmese Timezone)

Hteehlaing (Burmese: ထီးလှိုင်ရွာ) Village is located in Ywangan Township of Danuland, southern Shan State. The village code is 2018811. According to the 2014 census, a total of 918 people live there, including 454 men and 464 women.
