= Yawnghwe =

Shan state in Burma (1359–1959)

Coordinates: 20°39′48″N 96°56′06″E

Nyaung Shwe ယွင်ႈႁူၺ်ႈ
- Princely State of the Shan States
- 1359–1959
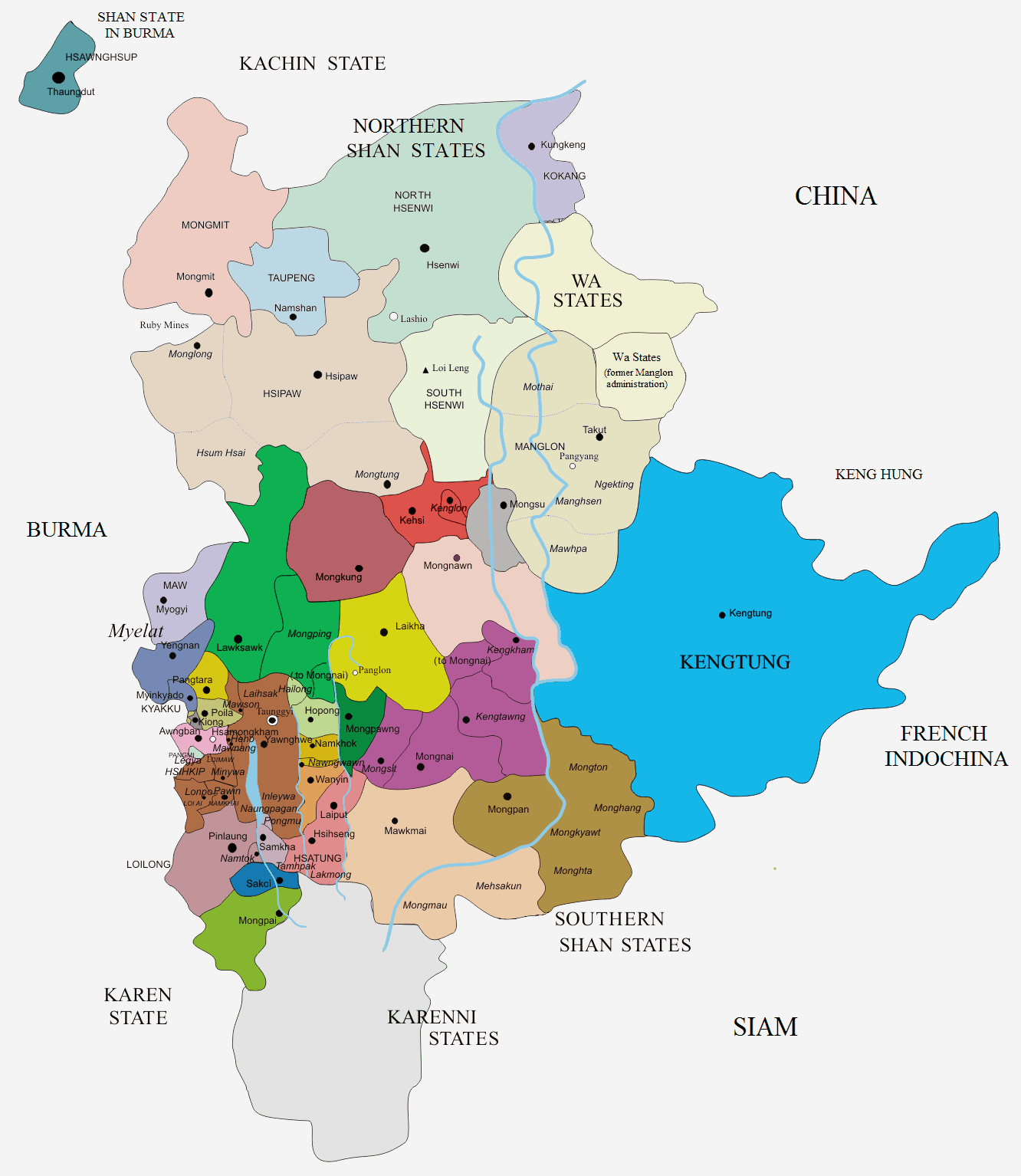
- Yawnghwe State in brown in a map of the Shan States
- Area
  - 1901: 2,241 km^{2} (865 sq mi)
- Population
  - 1901: 95,339
- Historical era: British Raj
  - Foundation of the city of Yawnghwe: 1359
  - Abdication of the last Saopha: 1959
Preceded by	Succeeded by
Ava Kingdom	Shan State

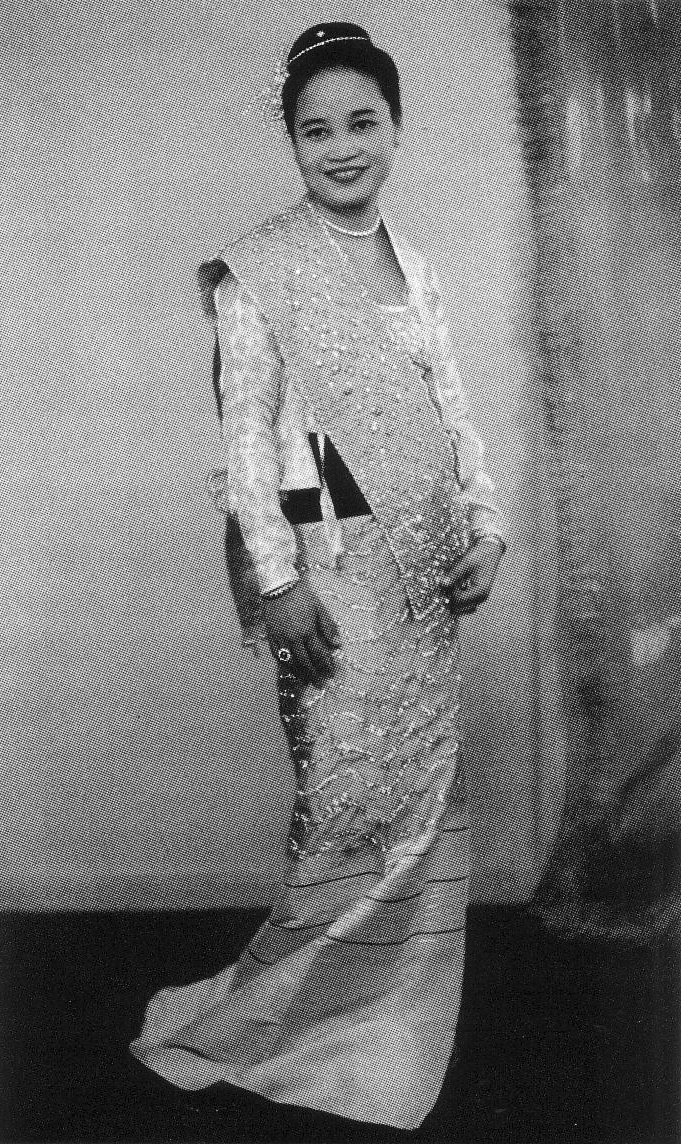
The Mahadevi of Yawnghwe Sao Nang Hearn Kham in London at the wedding of Princess Elizabeth in 1947.

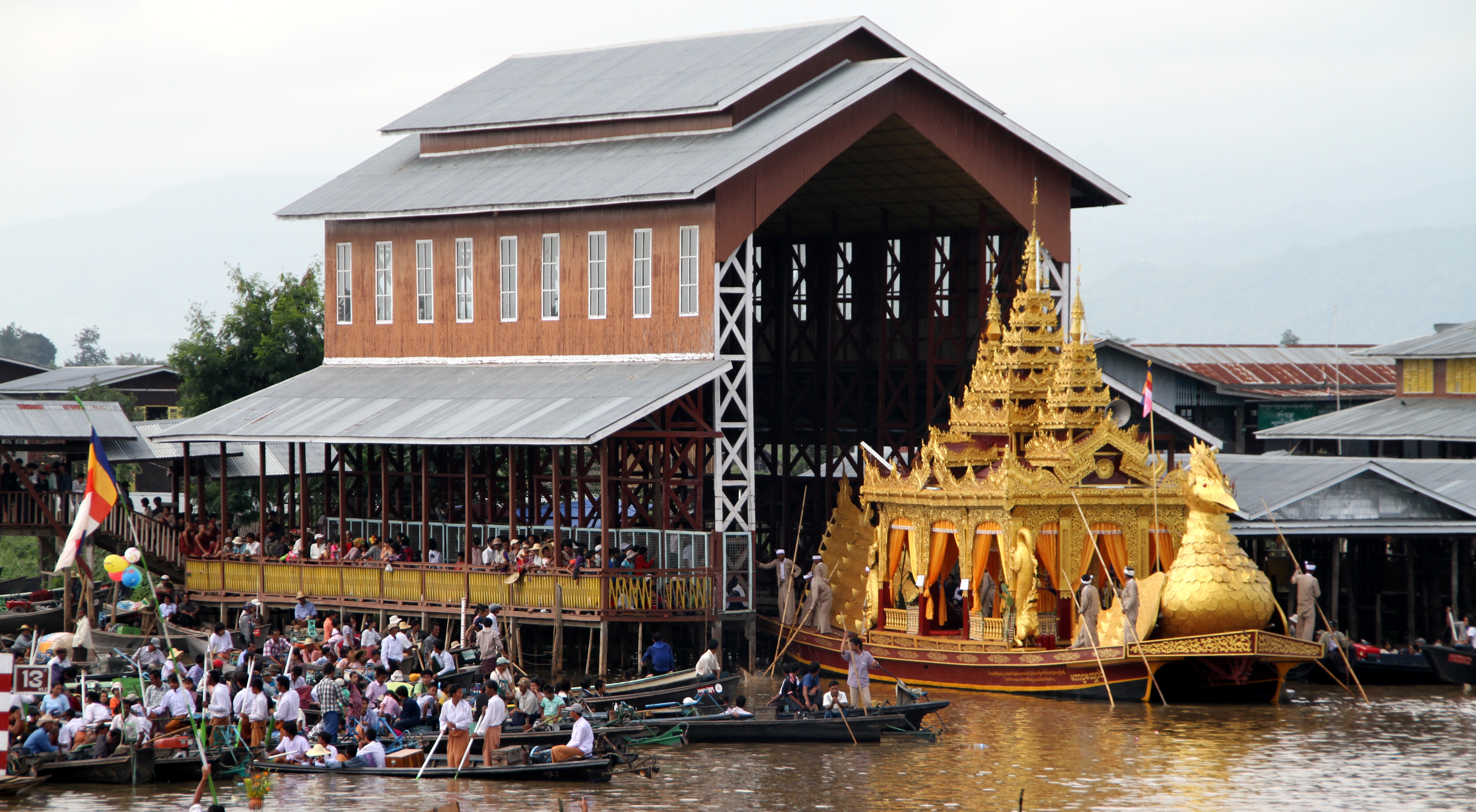
Phaung Daw U Pagoda Festival Karaweik barge.

Yawnghwe (Shan: ယွင်ႈႁူၺ်ႈ), also known as Nyaungshwe (Burmese: ညောင်ရွှေ), was a Shan state in what is today Myanmar. It was one of the most important of the Southern Shan States. Yawnghwe state included the Inle Lake. The administrative capital was Taunggyi, located in the northern part of the state. The Agent of the British government, the Superintendent of the Southern Shan States, resided at Taunggyi and the king's palace was at Yawnghwe.

== History ==
According to tradition in very distant antiquity there was a predecessor state in the area named Kambojaraṭṭha (ကမ္ဗောဇရဋ္ဌ).

The city of Yawnghwe, which gave name to the state, was founded in 1359 by two mythical brothers, Nga Taung and Nga Naung, who arrived from Tavoy (Dawei) and were allowed to build a capital by a prince who ruled the region. The brothers brought 36 families from Tavoy and established themselves in the new city.

Yawnghwe included the subsidiary states of Mawnang (Heho), Mawson, Loimaw, Loi-ai and Namhkai. Historically the majority of the population in the state belonged to the Intha, Pa-O, Danu, Shan and Taungyo people.

The state of Yawnghwe formally accepted the status of British protectorate in 1887.

Sao Shwe Thaik was the first president of the Union of Burma and the last Saopha of Yawnghwe. He married Sao Nang Hearn Kham of the royal family of North Hsenwi. His residence in Yawnghwe town, the Haw, is now the Nyaungshwe Cultural Museum and is open to the public.

== Saophas ==
The rulers of Yawnghwe bore the title of Saopha; their ritual style was Kambojaraṭṭha Sīripavara Mahāvaṃsa Sudhammarāja. They were entitled to a 9-gun salute by the British authorities.

- 1359 - 1434 Si Hseng Hpa
- 1434 - 1477 Hso Hseng Hpa
- 1477 - 1518 Hso Hung Hpa
- 1518 - 1557 Hso Yawk Hpa
- 1557 - 1574 Sao Maw Hkam
- 1574 - 1608 Kanh Ham Hpa
- 1608 - 1615 Mahadevi Nang Nawn Pe

1st

- 1608 - 1615 Sao Htoi
- 1615 - 1646 Mahadevi Nang Nawn Pe 2nd
- 1646 - 1658 Vacant
- 1658 - 1663 Sao Kang Hom Hpa
- 1663 - 1687 Hsu Wa
- 1687 - 1695 Kyundaung Sa
- 1695 - 1733 Hkam Leng
- 1733 - 1737 Htawk Sha Sa
- 1737 - 1746 Hsi Ton Sa
- 1746 - 1758 Hke Hsa Wa
- 1758 - 1758 Naw Mong 1st
- 1758 - 1761 Yawt Hkam
- 1761 - 1762 Hpong Hpa Ka Sa
- 1762 - 1815 Sao Yun
- 1815 - 1818 Sao Se U 1st
- 1818 - 1821 Naw Mong 2nd
- 1821 - 1852 Sao Se U 2nd
- 1852 - 1858 Sao So Hom
- 1858 - 1864 Sao Sa Hpa
- 1864 - 1885 Sao Maung 1st
- 1885 - 1889 Sao Chit Su
- 1889 - 1897 Sao On
- 1897 - 1926 Sao Maung 2nd
- 1926 - 1952 (Yawt Hkam Serk)
- 1952 - 1962 Sao Hseng Hpa

== Traditional royal ceremonies ==
Formerly the Saopha of Yawnghwe would personally welcome the four Buddha images during the annual festival at Hpaung Daw U Pagoda, an 18-day pagoda festival, during which the Buddha images were placed on a replica of a royal barge designed as a hintha bird and taken in a procession throughout Inle Lake. The elaborately decorated barge was towed by several boats of leg-rowers rowing in unison together with other accompanying boats. The images would be taken from the royal barge and a grand procession would take them to the saopha's palace (haw), entering the prayer hall from the eastern entrance, where the images would be kept for a few hours.

The festival is still held, but the images bypass the visit to the haw and are taken directly to the temple.

== See also ==
- Salute state
- Hso Khan Pha
