= Pindaya Caves =

Buddhist caves in Shan, Myanmar

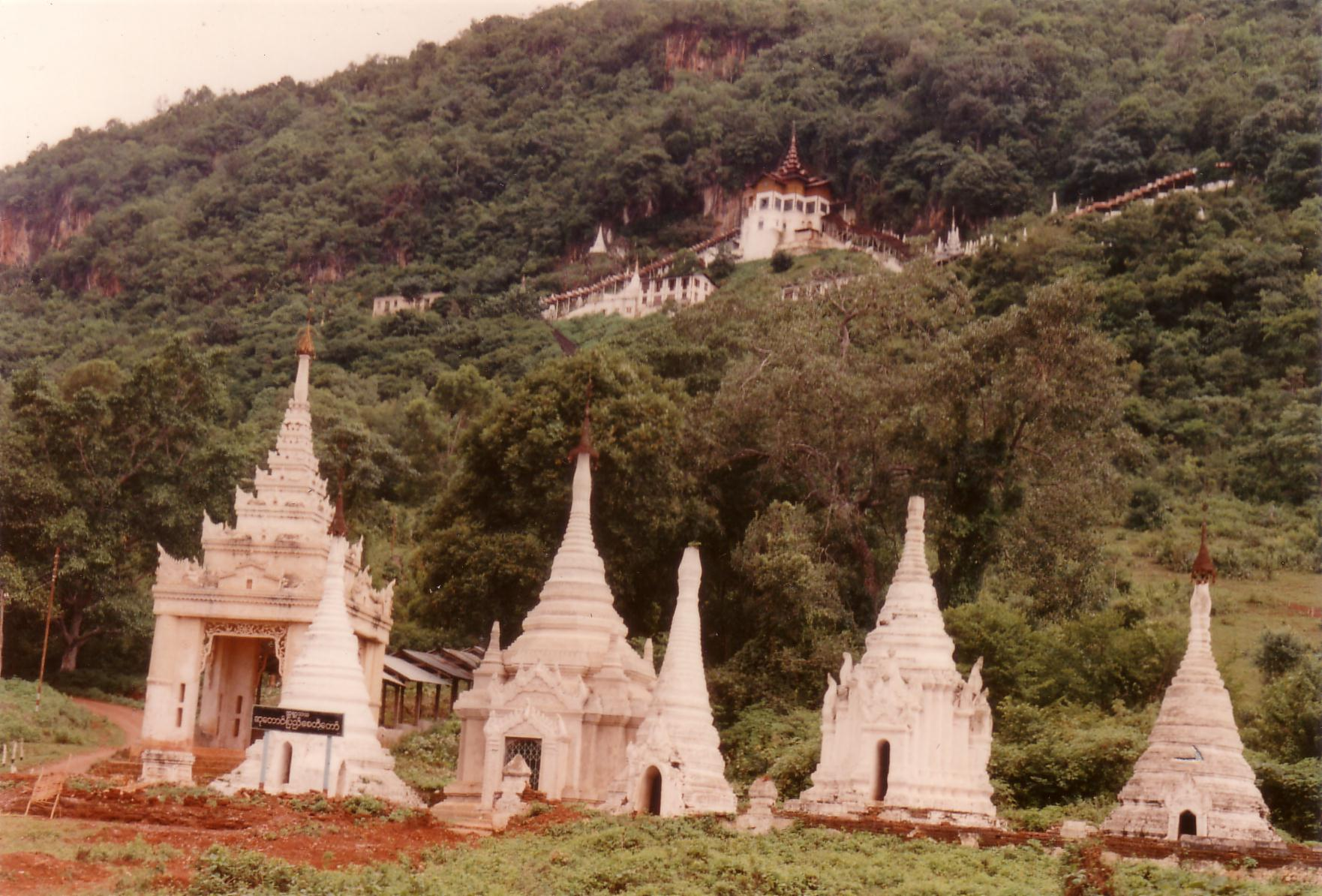
- Shwe U Min Pagoda and Pindaya Caves from the foot of the hill
- Interactive map of Pindaya Caves
- Location: Pindaya, Shan State, Burma
- Coordinates: 20°55′30″N 96°39′3.59″E
- Geology: Limestone

The Pindaya Caves (Burmese: ပင်းတယရွှေဥမင်, pronounced [pɪ́ɰ̃dəja̰ ʃwè ṵmɪ̀ɰ̃]; officially ပင်းတယရွှေဥမင်သဘာဝလိုဏ်ဂူဘုရား), located next to the town of Pindaya, Shan State, Burma (Myanmar) are a Buddhist pilgrimage site and a tourist attraction located on a limestone ridge in the Myelat region. The area is part of the ancestral homeland of the Danu people. There are three caves on the ridge which runs north-south, but only the southern cave can be entered and explored. It is not known whether the other two penetrate for any extended distance into the hillside. Scholars have been pushing for the site's inclusion in the UNESCO World Heritage List.

== Interior ==
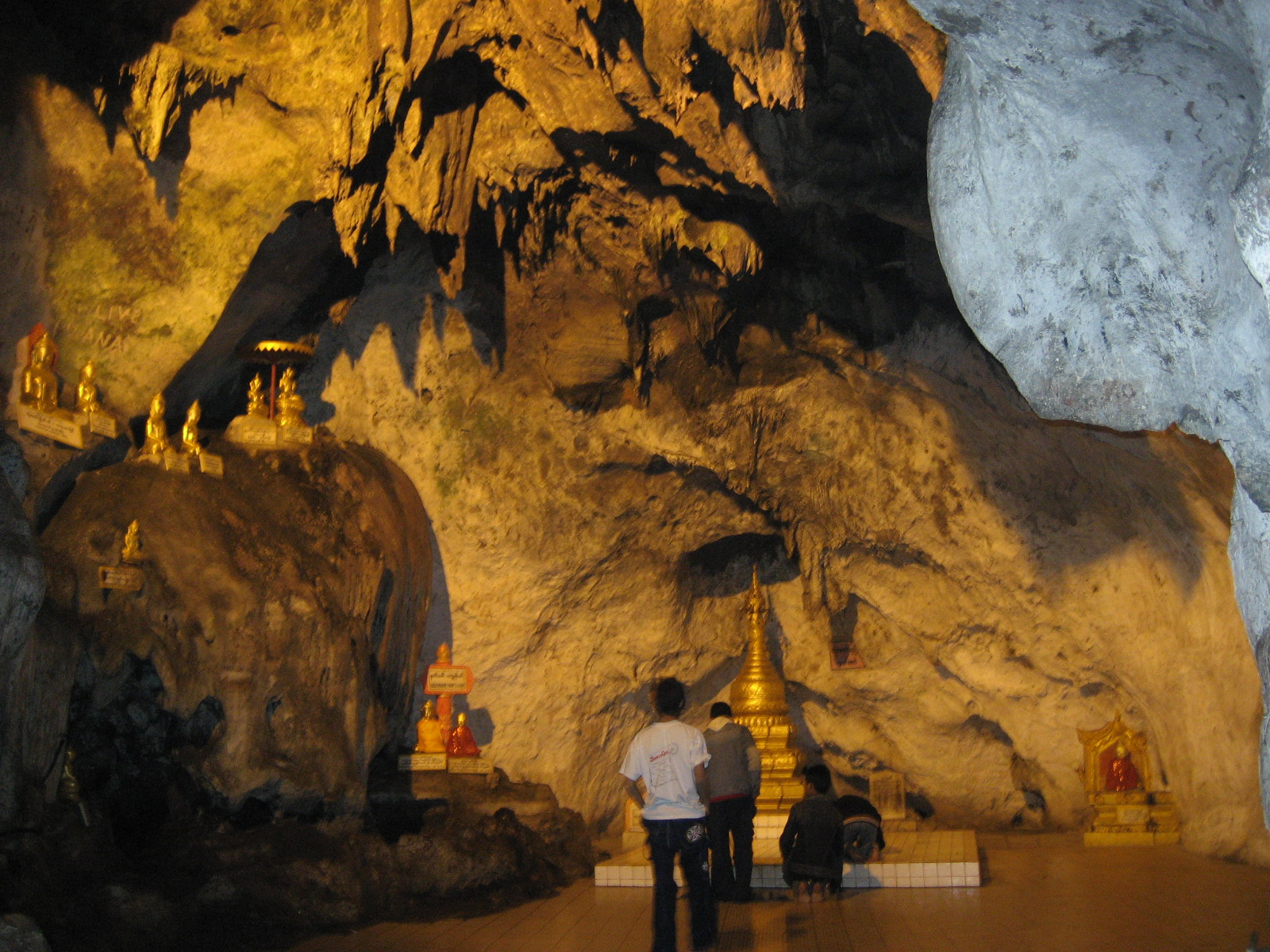
One of the caverns in the interior

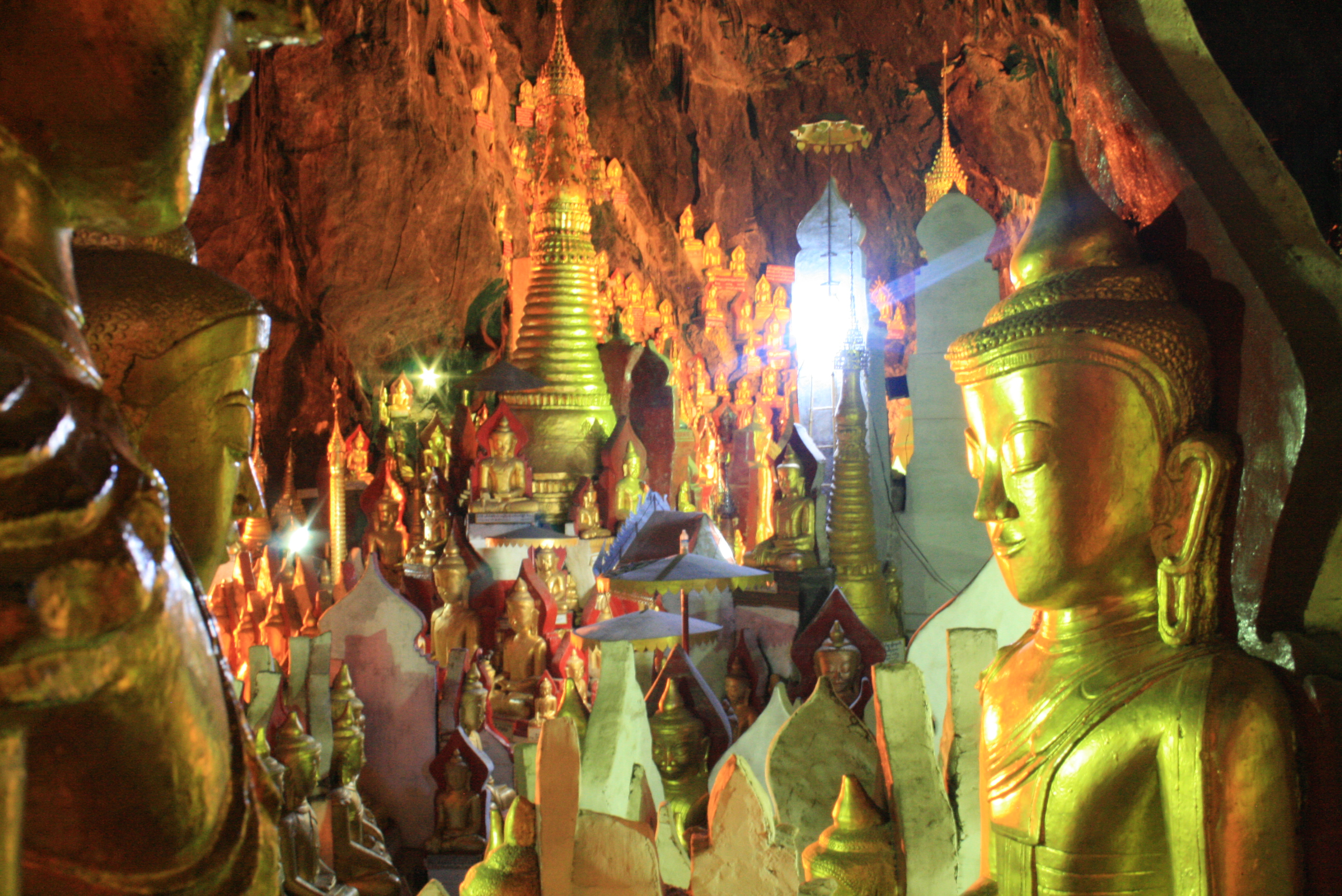
Inside the Pindaya Caves

The southernmost Pindaya cave can be entered and extends for about 490 feet along a well-worn path. It is known for its interior which contains over 8,000 images of Buddha. Some of the older statues and images in the cave have inscriptions dating to the late 18th century, or early Konbaung period, and the earliest one dates from 1773. There may be some images without inscriptions that are older, but based on the style elements, Than Tun believes that none of them is older than the early 18th century and even suggests 1750 as the earliest possible date. Although most statues are of late 18th and early 19th century, many other statues and images have been placed there on an ongoing basis by different donors throughout the cave's history up until the present time, from lay people to the ruling authorities. The collection as a whole forms an impressive display of Buddhist iconography and art from early Konbaung era to the modern period. No other place in Burma displays such a range of style, not only in the images, but also in the ornamental thrones and reredos which surround the images.

Within the cave, there are about seventy unique images of the Bhisakkaguru tradition dating to the late 18th century. They are unique in that the styling of hair, eyes, nose, ears, robe are different from most other images from Burma. The salient feature of this type of image is the holding of a seed in the upturned right palm. Than Tun reports that such images are found nowhere else in Burma, and based on Buddhist iconography, that these images are from the Mahayana tradition, and the conjecture is that the Pindaya cave at one time served the Mahayana Bhisakkaguru cult.

== Access ==
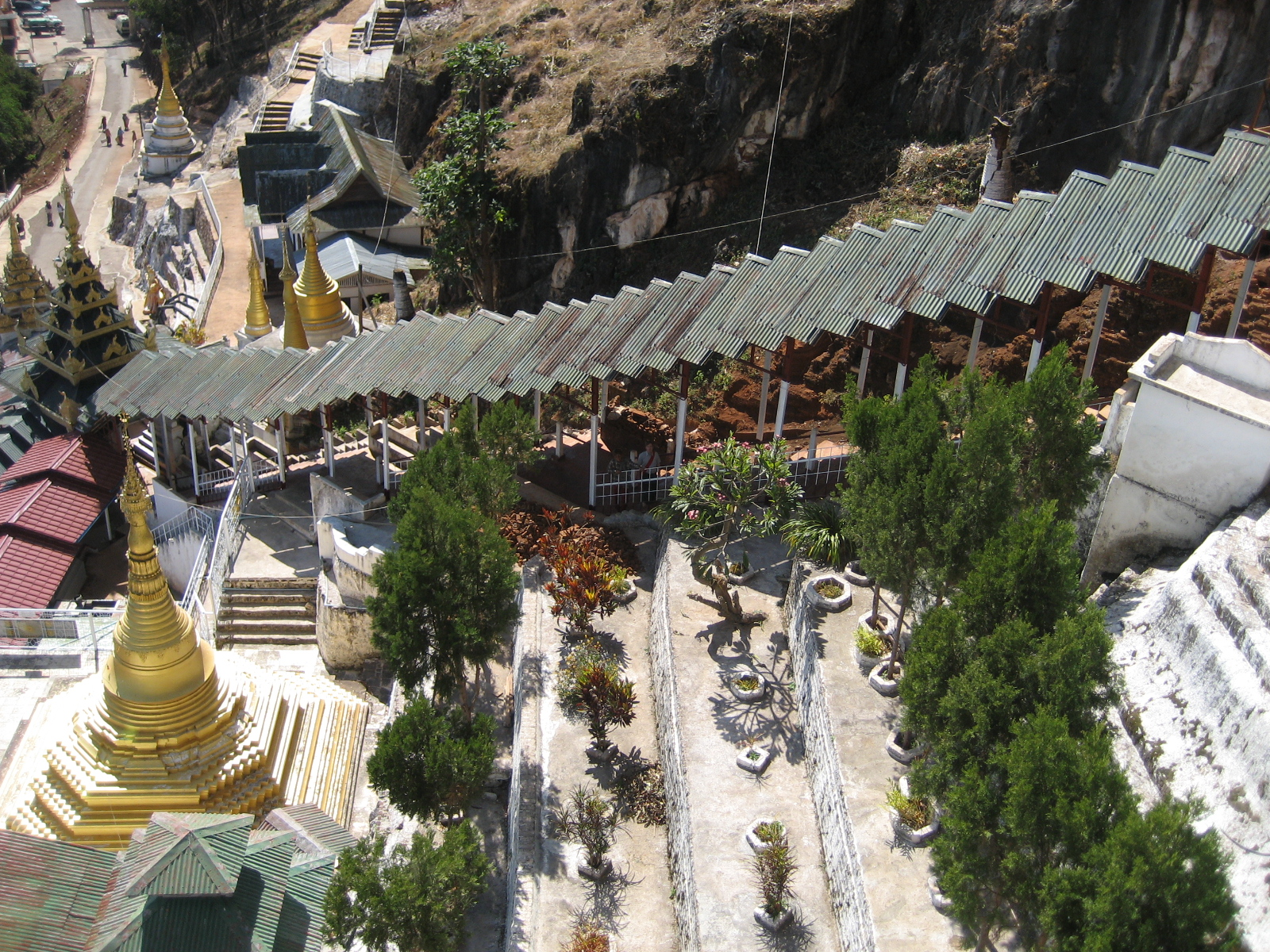
Hsaungdan (covered stairway) to the caves

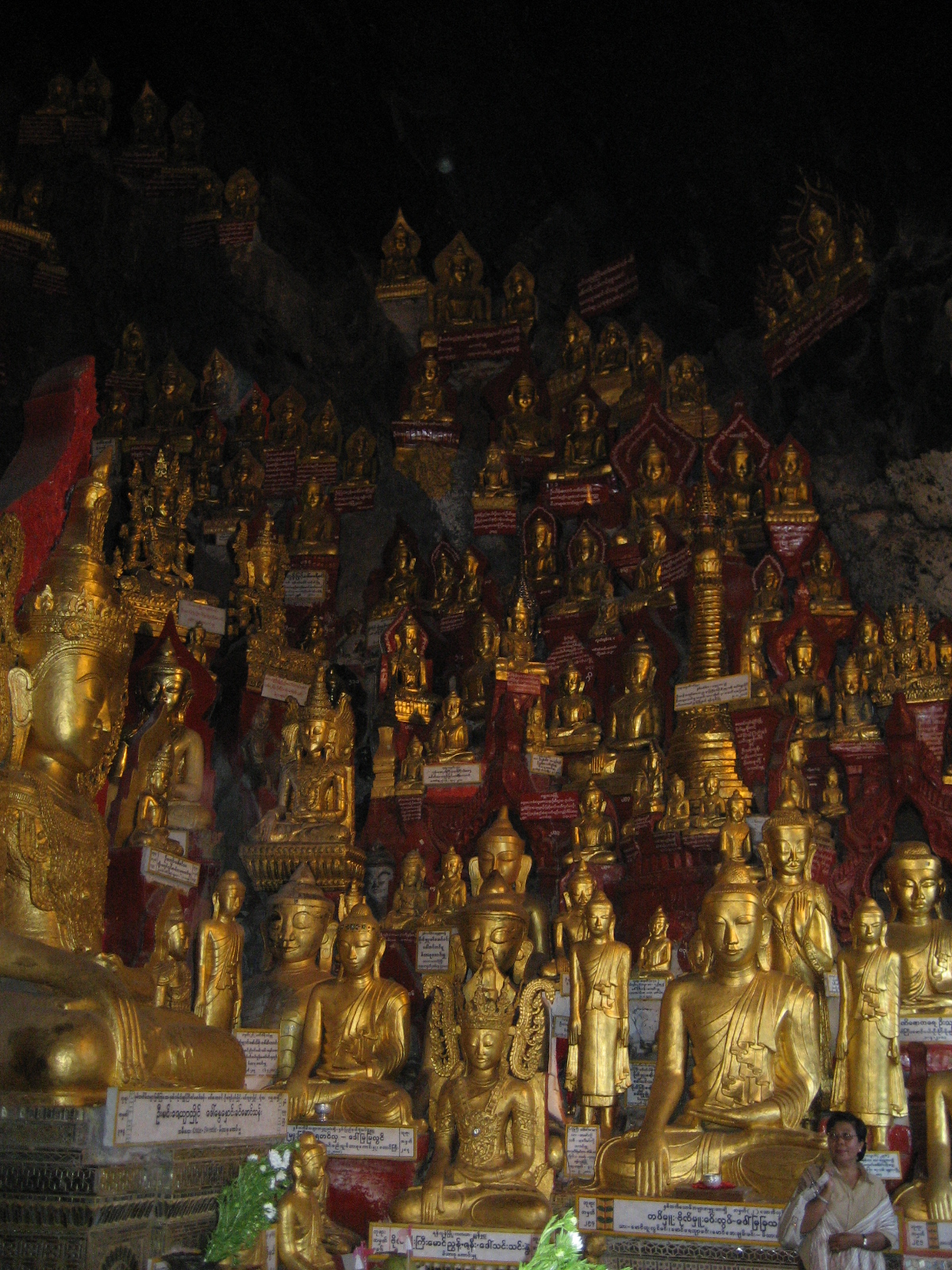
Buddha images to the right on entering the caves

There is a 15-m (49 ft) pagoda named Shwe U Min (Golden Cave) Pagoda at the entrance to the southernmost cave. Local legend attributes this pagoda as being built by King Asoka and repaired by King Alaungsithu in the 12th century, but this is not corroborated by any other historical source. In its present form and style, it is immediately apparent that the pagoda is of recent origin.

There is a large bronze bell at the southern entrance. The barely readable inscription on the bell states it as being cast in 1842 with a weight of 400 viss (654 kg).

The modern day entrance dates from 1925 when the entrance to the cave was enlarged by explosives, destroying some valuable images and epigraphs in the process. A steel structure was erected to accommodate the many pilgrims. Dedication inscriptions from this renovation indicate a wide range of donors, not only from the Theravada community, but also from the Hindu, Chinese and even Muslim communities. During this renovation, some unique images were removed to a nearby monastery. Unfortunately, these images were destroyed during World War II in a bombing raid. An elevator was added in more recent times.

== Legends ==
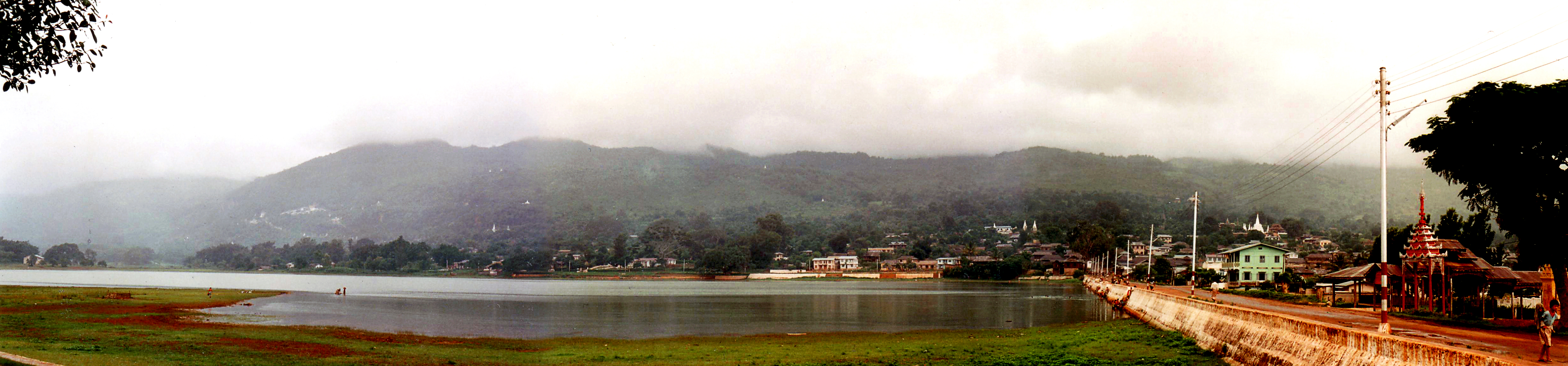
Pindaya town, lake and caves

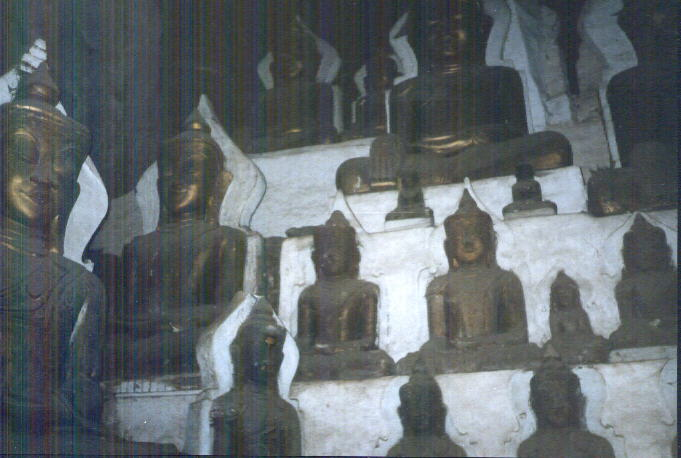
Inside Pindaya Caves

There are many legends surrounding the Pindaya cave. One is that a blocked-off path at the end of the cave leads to the ancient city of Bagan. There is also the legend of the seven princesses bathing in a lake and how they were captured by a giant spider and trapped in the cave to be rescued by Prince Kummabhaya of Yawnghwe. Sculptures of the spider and the prince aiming with his bow and arrow have been added in recent times at the entrance of the covered stairway to the caves.
