= Kyawkku State =

Coordinates: 21°48′N 96°55′E

Kyawkku Hsiwan
- State of the Shan States
- c. 1600–1922
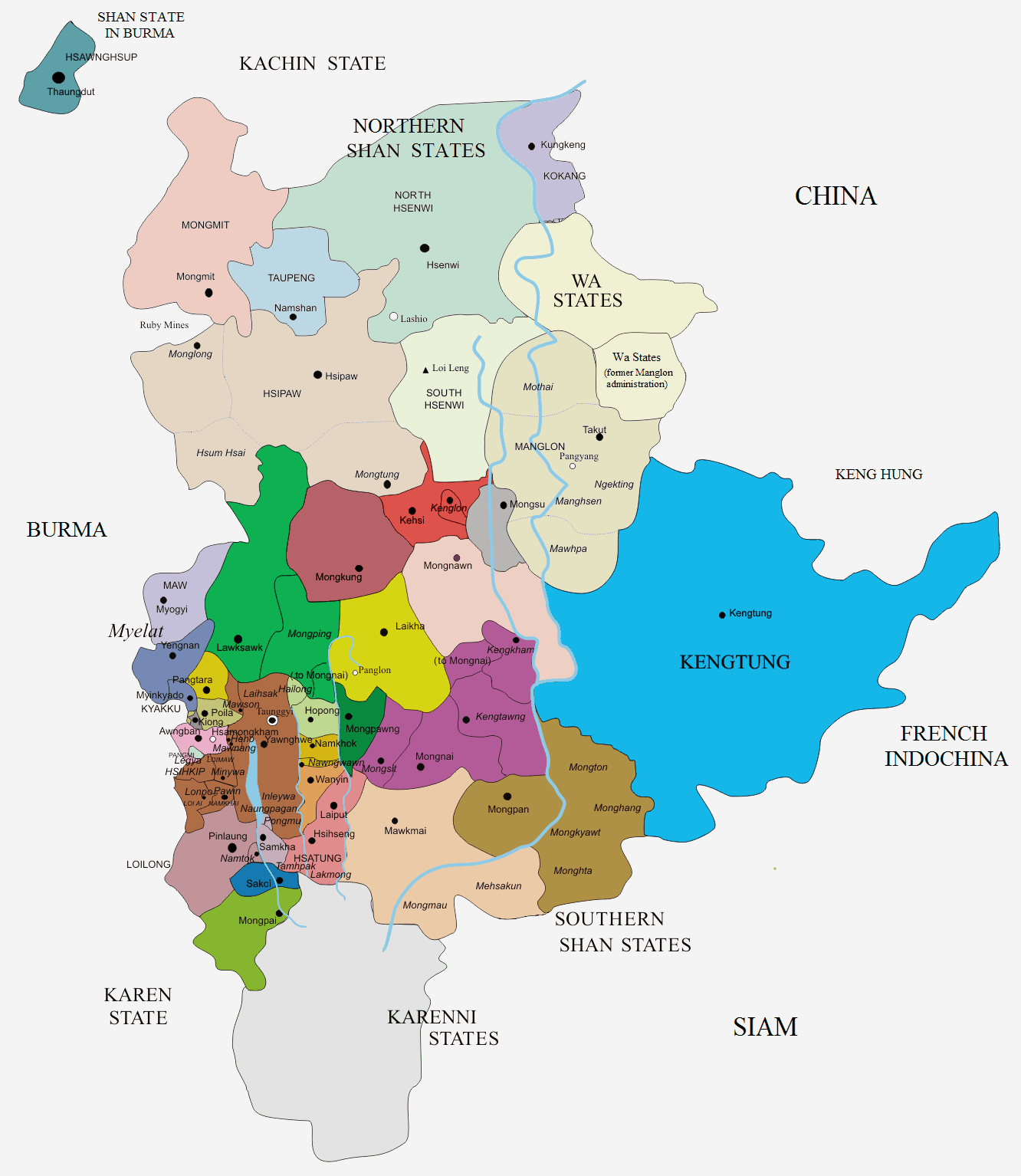
- Kyawkku State in a map of the Shan States
- Area
  - 1901 Census of India: 243 km^{2} (94 sq mi)
- Population
  - 1901 Census of India: 4,771
- History
  - Kyawkku Hsiwan state founded: 20 March
  - Merged with Poila State: 1922
Preceded by	Succeeded by
Kingdom of Burma	Shan State

Kyawkku (also known as Kyawkku Hsiwan or Kyakku) was a Shan state in the Myelat region of what is today Burma. Its capital was the village of Kyawkku (Myinkyado) which had 344 inhabitants in 1901.

== History ==
Kyawkku was founded around 1600 CE. It was a tributary of Burma until 1887, when the Shan states submitted to British rule after the fall of the Konbaung dynasty. The state was merged with Poila in 1922.

=== Rulers ===
The title of Kyawkku's rulers was Ngwegunhmu.

- .... - .... Nga San Bon
- .... - .... Nga San Mya
- .... - 1783 Nga San Ma
- 1783 - 1820 Nga Kaw Tha
- 1820 - 1821 Nga Thi Ri
- 1821 - 1843 Nga Chit Win
- 1844 - 1852 Nga Shwe Maung I (1st time)
- 1852 - 1856 Nga Shwe Yit -Regent
- 1856 - 1863 Nga Shwe Maung I (2nd time)
- 1863 - 1865 Nga Yan Kon -Regent
- 1865 - 1873 Nga San
- 1873 - 1874 Nga Shwe Maung II -Regent
- 1874 - 1876 Nga Tha U -Regent
- 1876 - 1877 Nga Tun -Regent
- 1877 - 1881 Nga Pai Su (Nga Pyan)
- 1881 - 1922? Nga Thaing (b. 1873 - d. 1922?)
