= Loi-ai =

State of the Shan States

Coordinates: 20°39′N 96°37′E

Loi ai
- State of the Shan States
- Before 1814–1930
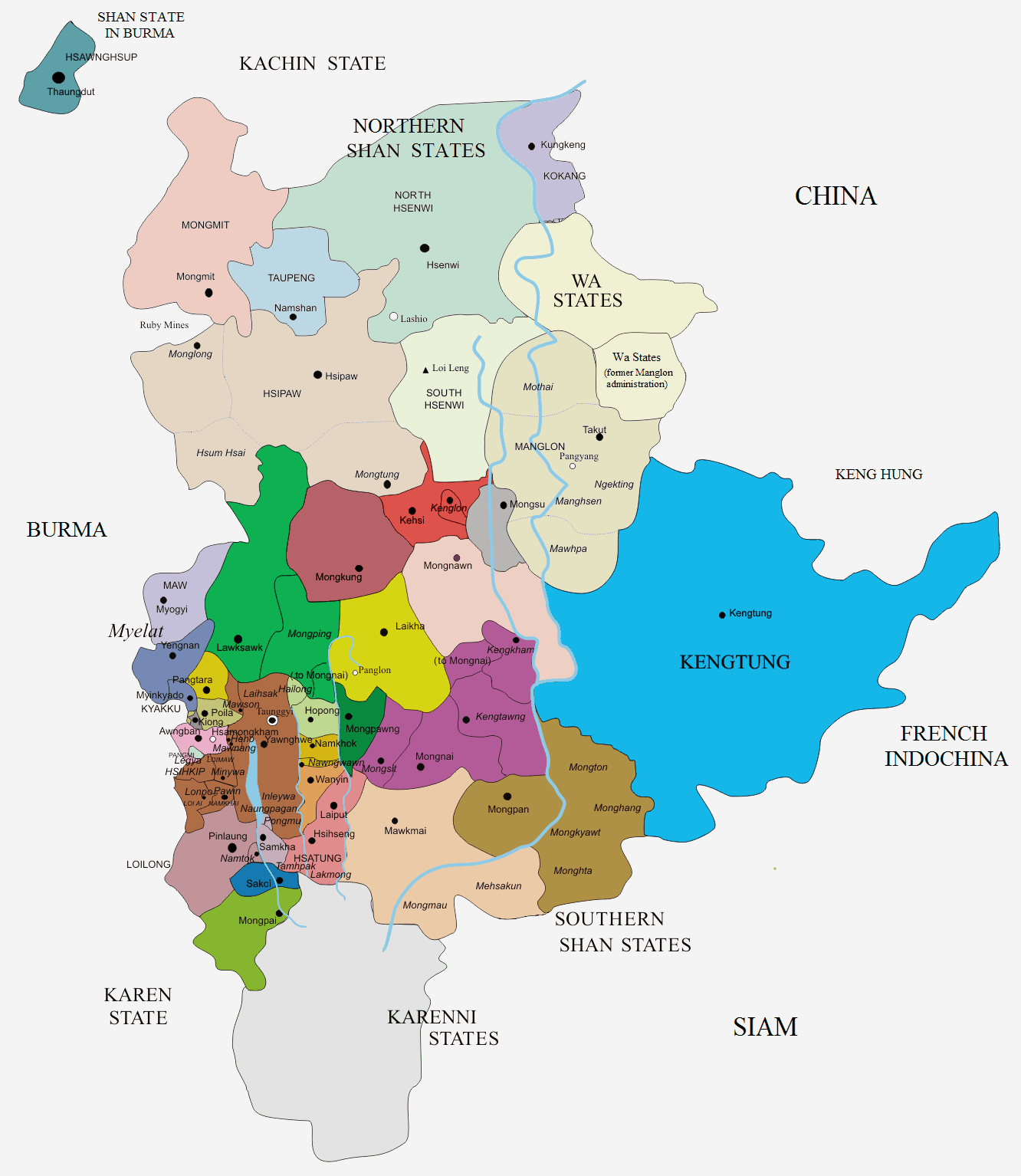
- Loi-ai State in a map of the Shan States
- Area
  - 1901: 517 km^{2} (200 sq mi)
- Population
  - 1901: 5,442
- History
  - State founded: Before 1814
  - Merged with Hsamönghkam: 1930
Succeeded by
Hsamonghkam

Loi-ai (also known as Lwe-e) was a Shan state in the Myelat region of what is today Burma. It was one of the westernmost Shan states, bordering with Yamethin district of Upper Burma. The capital was Lonpo (Aungpan) and the population was mostly Pa-O, but there were also Danu, Shan and Karen people in the area.

== History ==
Loi-ai was a subsidiary state of Yawnghwe, another state of the Myelat division of the Southern Shan States. Loi ai State merged with Hsamönghkam State in 1930.

=== Rulers ===
The rulers bore the title Ngwegunhmu.

==== Ngwegunhmus ====
- .... - .... Maung Baung [1st ruler]
- .... - .... Maung Maing
- .... - 1814 Paw Kyi
- 1814 - 1834 Maung Shwe
- 1834 - 1864 Kaw Thaw
- 1864 - 1868 Maung Kaing (d. 1870)
- 1868 - 1869 Nga Meik -Regent
- 1869 - 1870 Nga Hpo -Regent
- 1870 - Oct 1903 Hkun Shwe Kyn (b. 18.. - d. 1903)
- Oct 1903 - 1913 Maung Po Kinm (b. 1876 - d. 1913)
- 1913 - 1925 Chit Pa -Regent (b. 1853 - d. 19..)
- 1913 - 19.. Maung Sao Maung (b. 1904 - d. ....)
