= Yengan =

Historic state in Myanmar

Coordinates: 21°09′59″N 96°26′40″E

Yengan was a Shan state in what is today Burma. It belonged to the Myelat Division of the Southern Shan States.

== Rulers ==
The rulers of Yengan State bore the title of Ngwegunhmu.

=== Ngwegunhmus ===
- c.1857 - 1860 Maung Htun Lin (d. c.1864)
- 1861 - 1886 Maung Nyo Sein (d. 1886)
- 1886 Maung Thu Daw (1st time) (b. 1878 - d. 19..)
- 1886 (10 days) Mi Thaung (f)
- 1896 (25 days) Maung Chit + Heng Yin Yo
- 1887 - 19.. Maung Thu Daw (2nd time) (s.a.)
- 1887 - May 1898 .... -Regent
