= Pangmi =

Shan state in modern Burma

Coordinates: 20°35′06″N 96°41′32″E

Pangmi (Burmese: Pinhmi) was a Shan state in the Myelat region of what is today Burma. It was very small, having an area of only 29 sq mi (75 km^{2}), and was almost entirely enclosed by Hsamonghkam. Its population was mostly Danu and Pa-O.
