= Peik Chin Myaung Cave =

Religious cave in Myanmar

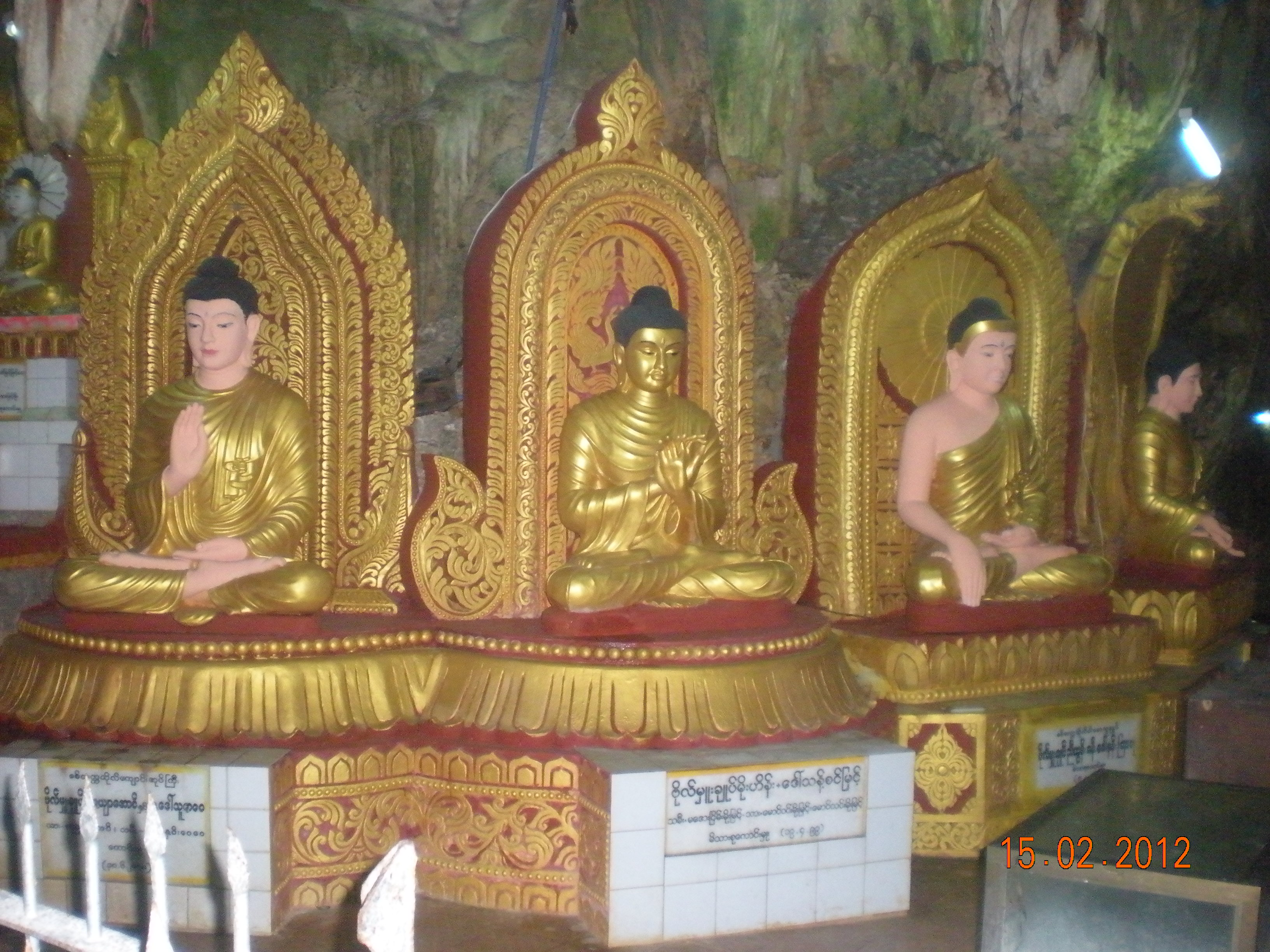
- Stupas and Stalactites inside cave
- Interactive map of Peik Chin Myaung Cave
- Location: 23km East of Pyin Oo Lwin
- Coordinates: 22°05′45″N 96°37′06″E
- Depth: 20 m (66 ft)
- Length: 1,600 m (5,200 ft)
- Discovery: 1990 by local Nepalese
- Geology: Limestone
- Access: Show cave open to the public; water cascade flows from the entrance

Peik Chin Myaung (ပိတ်ချင်းမြောင်လိုဏ်ဂူ) is a limestone stalactite cave situated south of Wetwun village, 23 km from Pyin Oo Lwin, Myanmar. The cave is a tourist site on the Lashio road.

== History ==
The cave was firstly developed by local Burmese Gurkhas and later co-opted by the Myanmar government as a tourist attraction in 1990. The cave covers an area of 45 acres, where local plants named Peik Chin, alike long pepper vine used to grow by the mouth of the cave. It is estimated to be 230 million to 310 million years old from the formation of limestone and hillocks. After the establishment of shrines with many Buddhist stupas inside the cave, it has also been called Maha Nadamu cave.

== Local interest ==
The local people and many Myanmar pilgrims enjoyed swimming at the entrance of the cave. The water flows and cascades from the 600 m (2,000 feet) deep cave. Many locals from Pyin Oo Lwin have shops with local products such as wine and dried game meat (ဆတ်သားခြောက်) and souvenirs for visitors.

== See also ==
- Pindaya Caves
- Pyin Oo Lwin

== Gallery ==
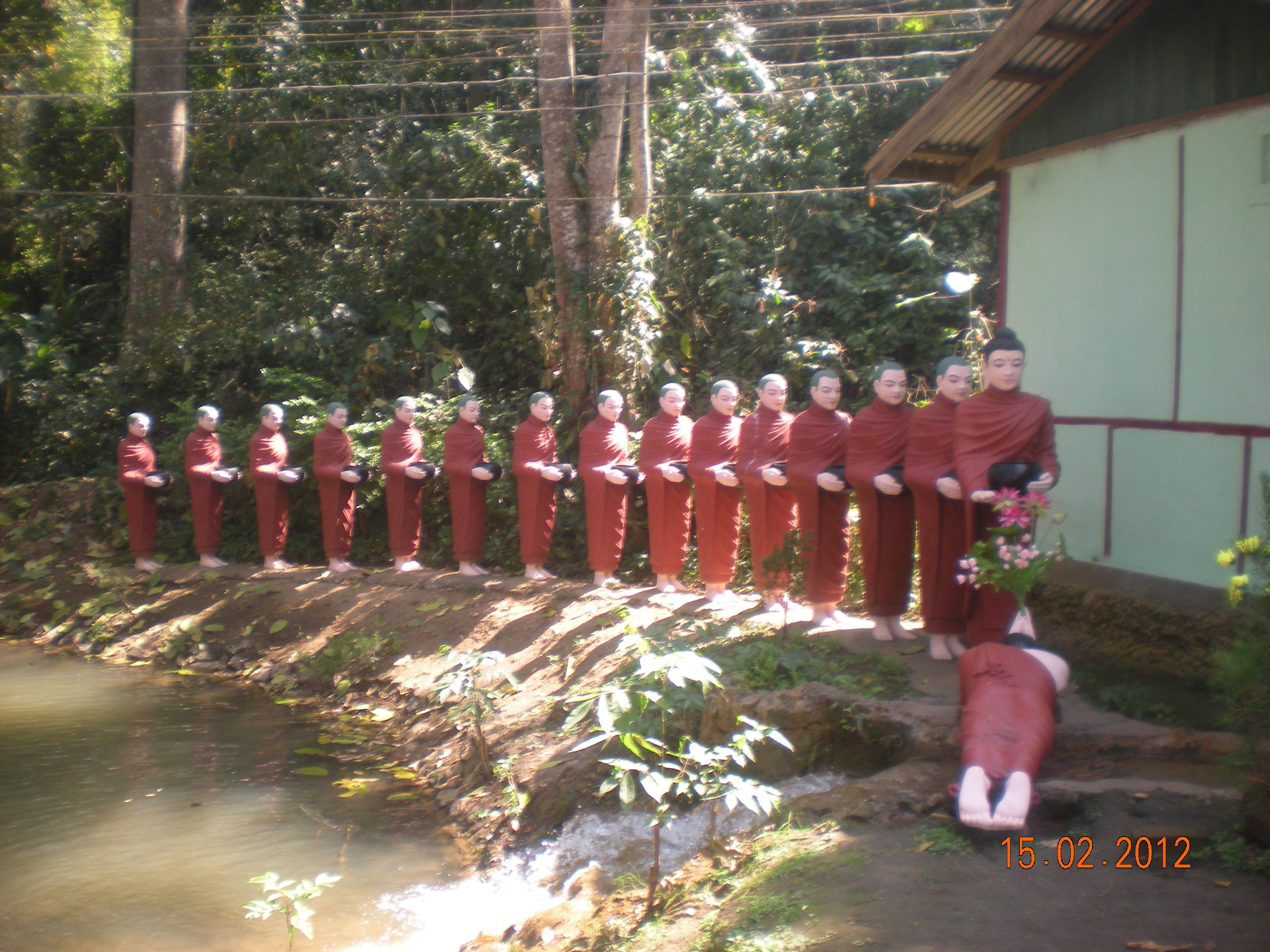
Buddha and Yahanthar on alms walk

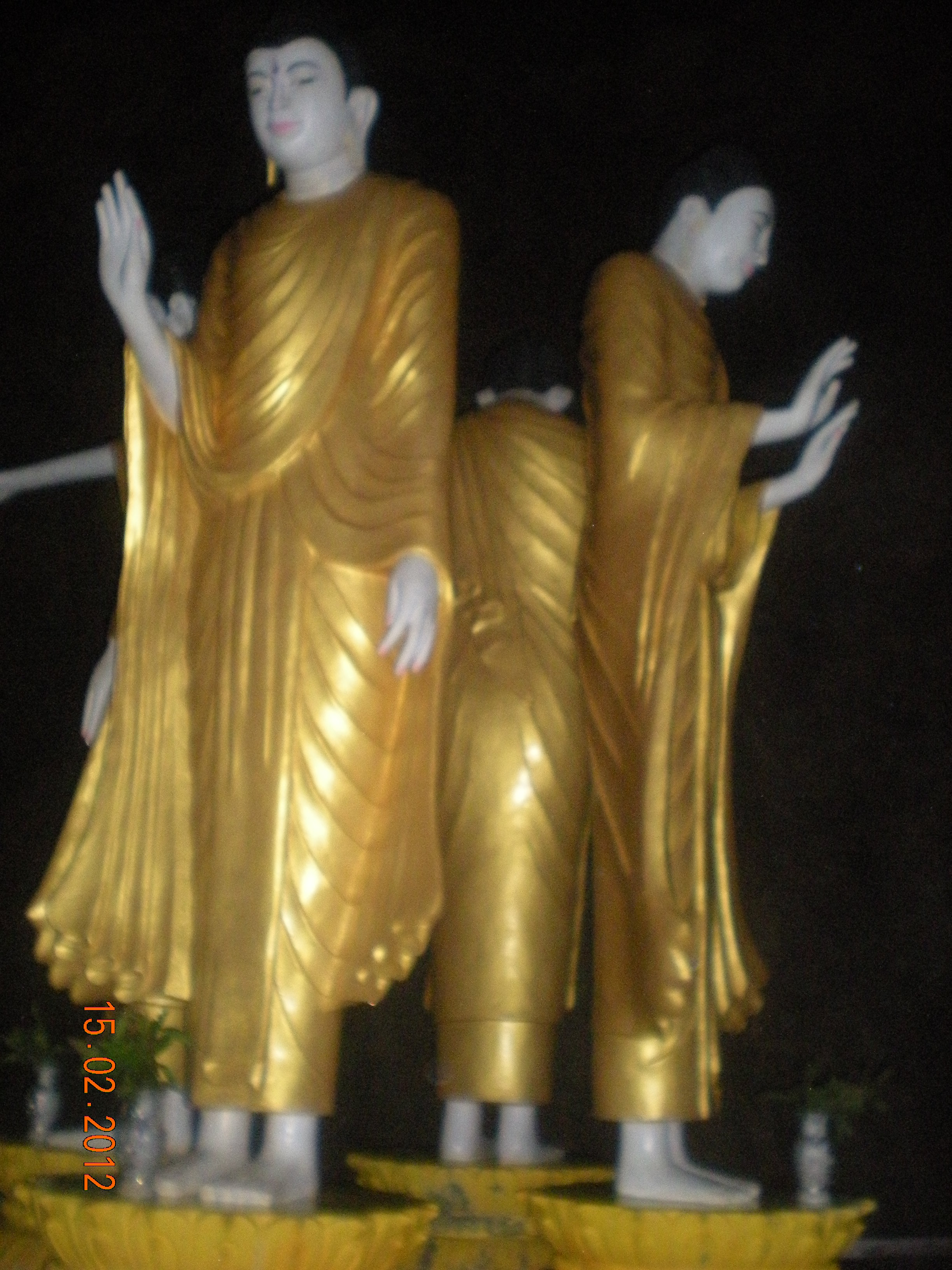
Standing Stupas image inside cave

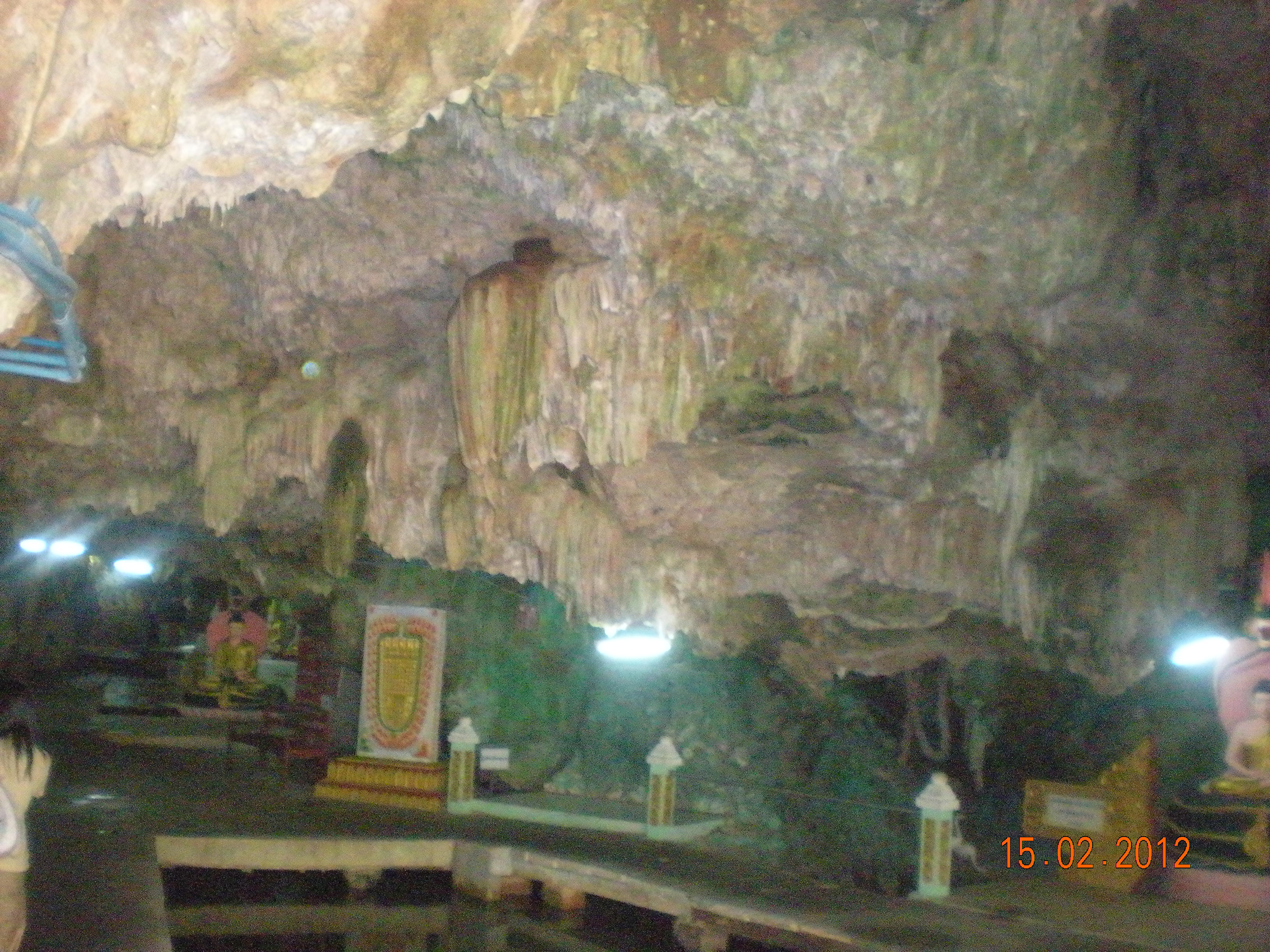
Stalactites cave

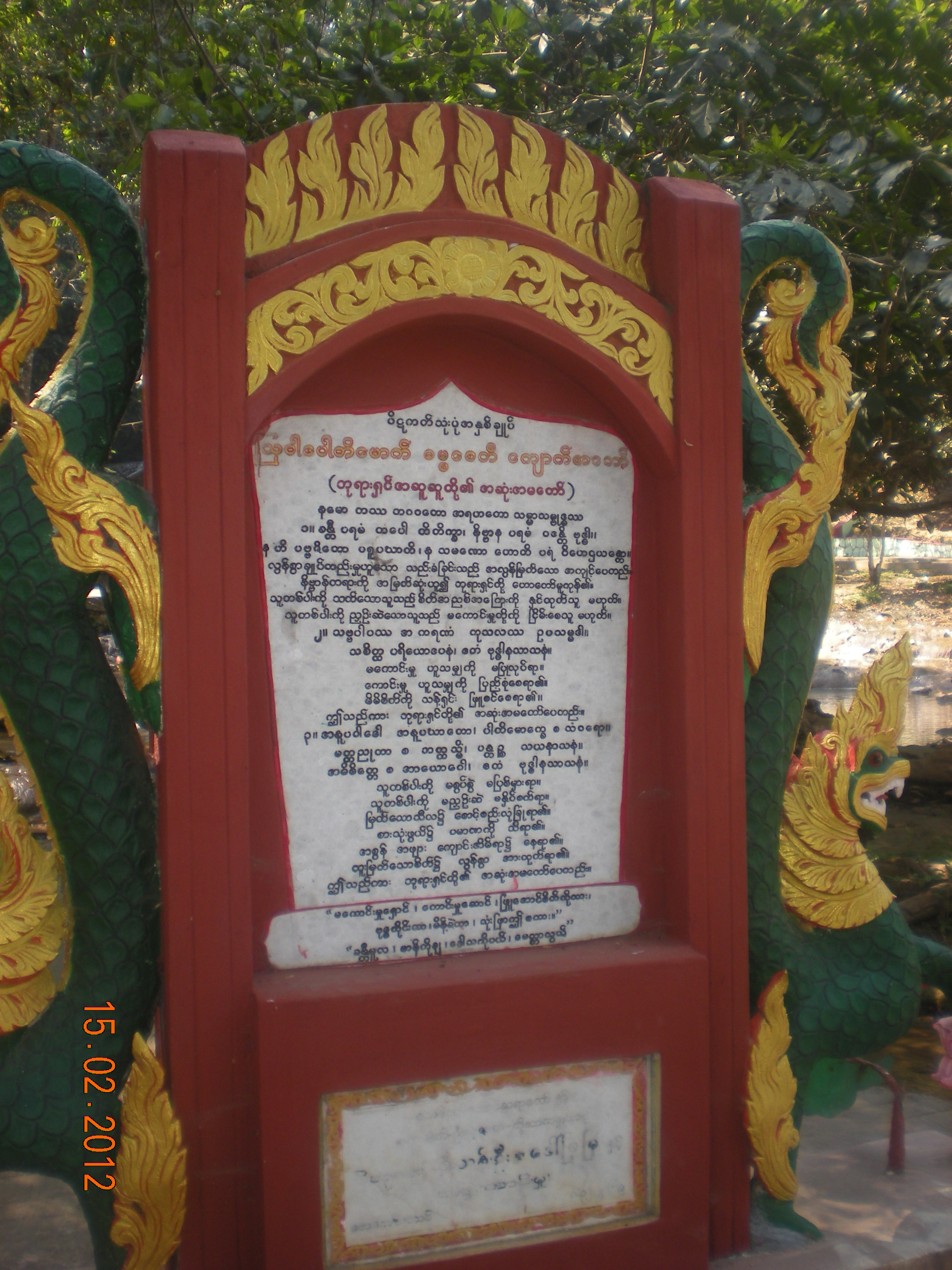
Landmark of the cave

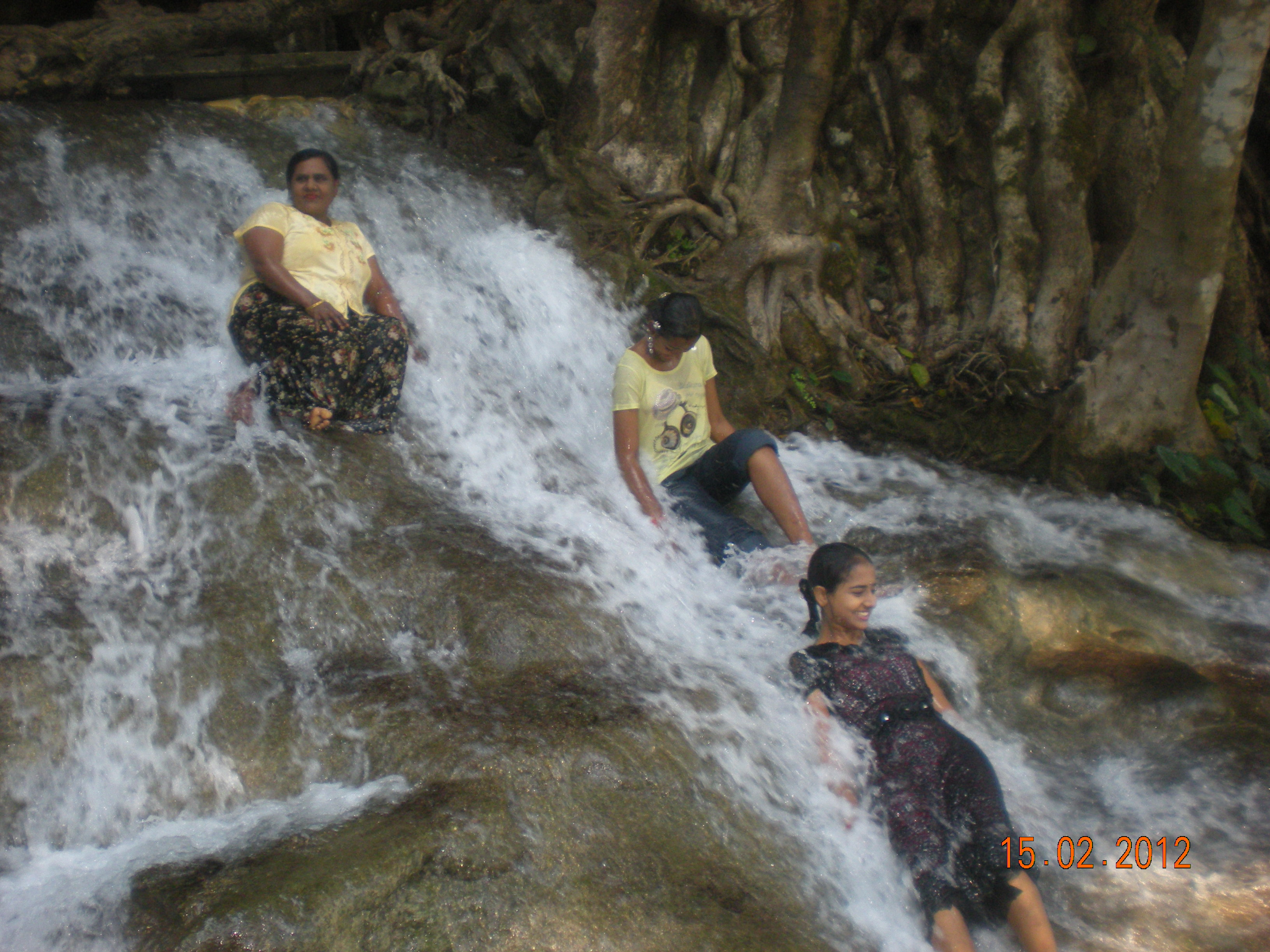
Local swimmers and waterfall at entrance
