= BAW (disambiguation) =

Beijing Automobile Works is a China-based automotive manufacturing company.

Baw can mean the following:

- Baw District, Sudan
- the Burmese name of Maw, one of the Shan states in 19th to 20th centuries locating in today's Burma

BAW can also be the acronym of the following:

- the ICAO airline designation of British Airways
- the National Rail station code of Blackwater railway station, Blackwater, Hart
- Brain Awareness Week, a neuroscience organization
