= Pangtara =

Coordinates: 20°57′N 96°40′E

Pangtara (Burmese: Pindaya) was a Shan state in what is today the Pindaya Township of Burma. It belonged to the Myelat Division of the Southern Shan States.
