= Nyaungshwe Cultural Museum =

Coordinates: 20.663°N 96.935°E

- ညောင်ရွှေယဉ်ကျေးမှုပြတိုက်
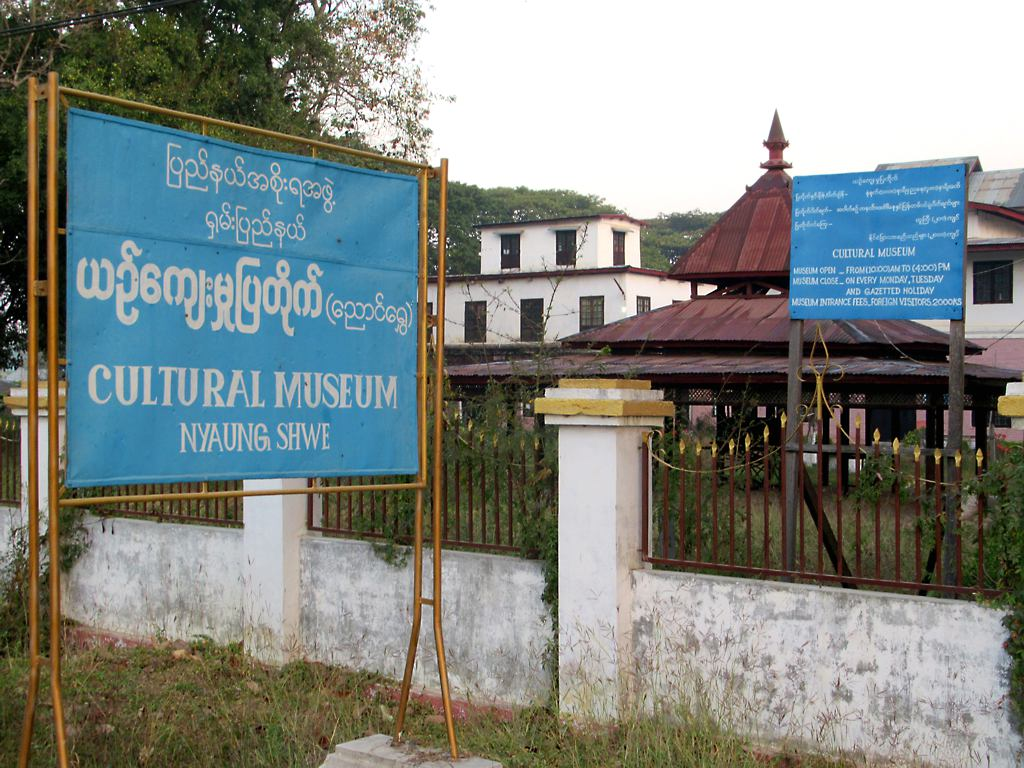
- Former name: Nyaungshwe Palace; Nyaungshwe Haw
- Established: 1913
- Location: Nyaungshwe, Shan State, Myanmar
- Accreditation: Ministry of Religious Affairs and Culture (Myanmar)

Nyaungshwe Cultural Museum (Burmese: ညောင်ရွှေယဉ်ကျေးမှုပြတိုက်) is a history museum dedicated to the former Shan saopha of Yawnghwe Sao Shwe Thaik, as well as to other rulers of Shan states. Located in Nandawon Ward, Nyaungshwe, Shan State, Myanmar, the museum is known for its collection of royal costumes. The museum is housed in the former palace of Sao Shwe Thaik, known as the Nyaungshwe Haw (ညောင်ရွှေဟော်, Shan: ႁေႃယွင်ႁူၺ်ႈ) in Burmese. The palace is one of the few surviving examples of Shan palace architecture.

== History ==
The local ruler of Yawnghwe State, Saw Maung, built the Nyaungshwe Haw in 1913, after the old palace was destroyed during a fire in 1908. Built over the course of 10 years at a cost of 300,000 Burmese kyats, the palace's design fused the design of both Mandalay Palace and traditional Shan palaces. The main building, which is crowned with a seven-tiered spiral roof called pyatthat, measures 200 by 194 feet (61 m × 59 m). The building consists of two floors and three main halls, including a main reception hall, an outer hall, and an inner hall. The palace grounds also contain separate halls housing the residences of the saopha's family.

In 1962, Ne Win staged the 1962 Burmese coup d'état and arrested Sao Shwe Thaik, who died in prison that November. In 1972, the palace was nationalised by the Burmese government and subsequently opened to the public as the Museum of Shan Chieftains. In 2003, it was renamed the Nyaungshwe Cultural Museum. In 2006, the museum's collections were transferred to Naypyidaw, the new national capital. In September 2007, the palace was reopened as the Buddha Museum. In 2014, the museum's administration was transferred from the Ministry of Culture to the Shan State government.

In 2019, the museum loaned 30 of its 138 royal costumes to the National Museum of Myanmar in Yangon, as part of a special exhibition.

== Collections ==
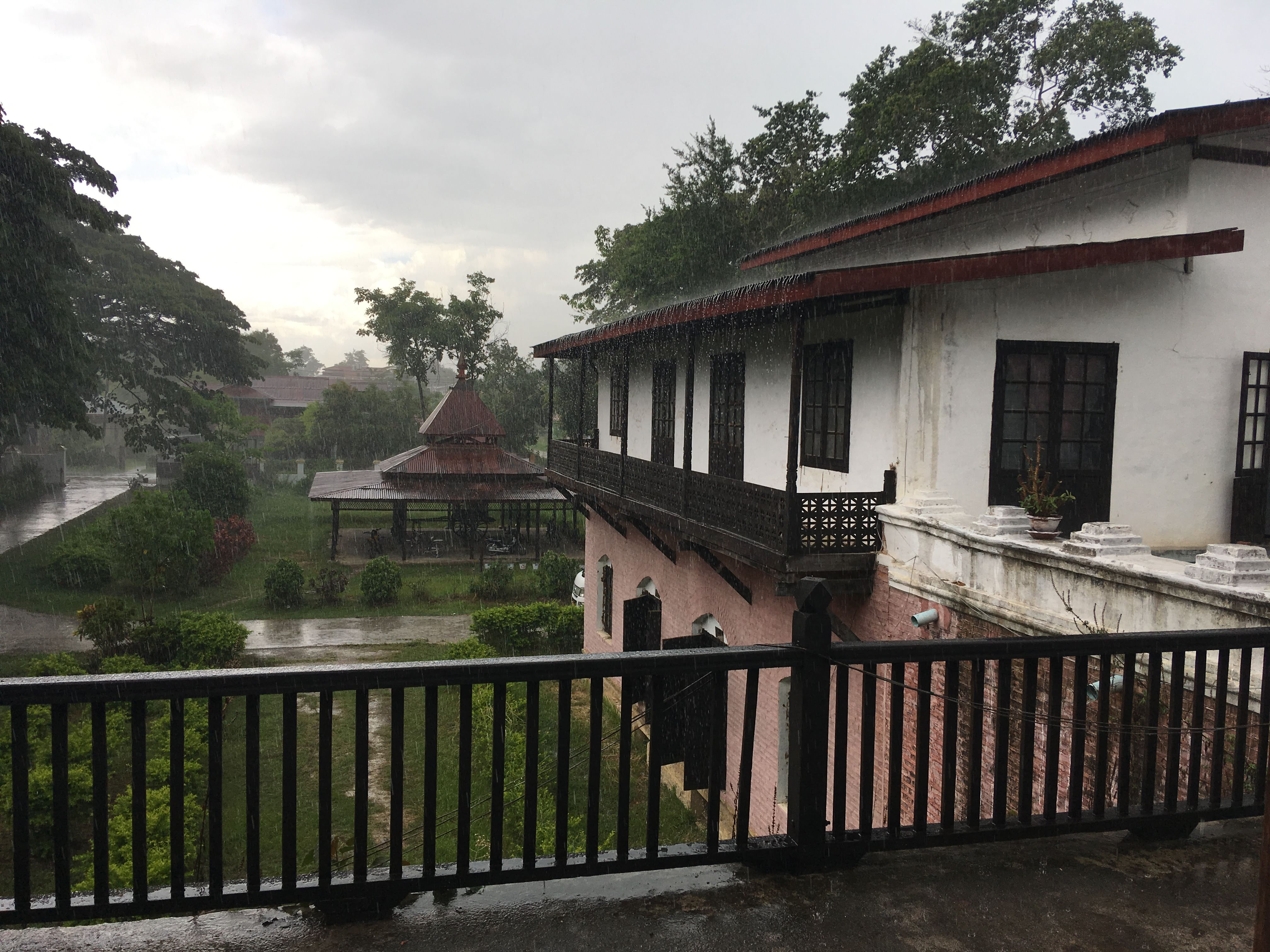
Grounds of the former palace

The museum houses a collection of royal artifacts and regalia, including royal thrones, tables, divans, sedans, and palanquins, as well as royal costumes belonging to the Shan rulers of local principalities including Nyaungshwe and Kyaingtong. Religious material, manuscripts, lacquerware, as well as historical records of Shan States are also curated at the museum.

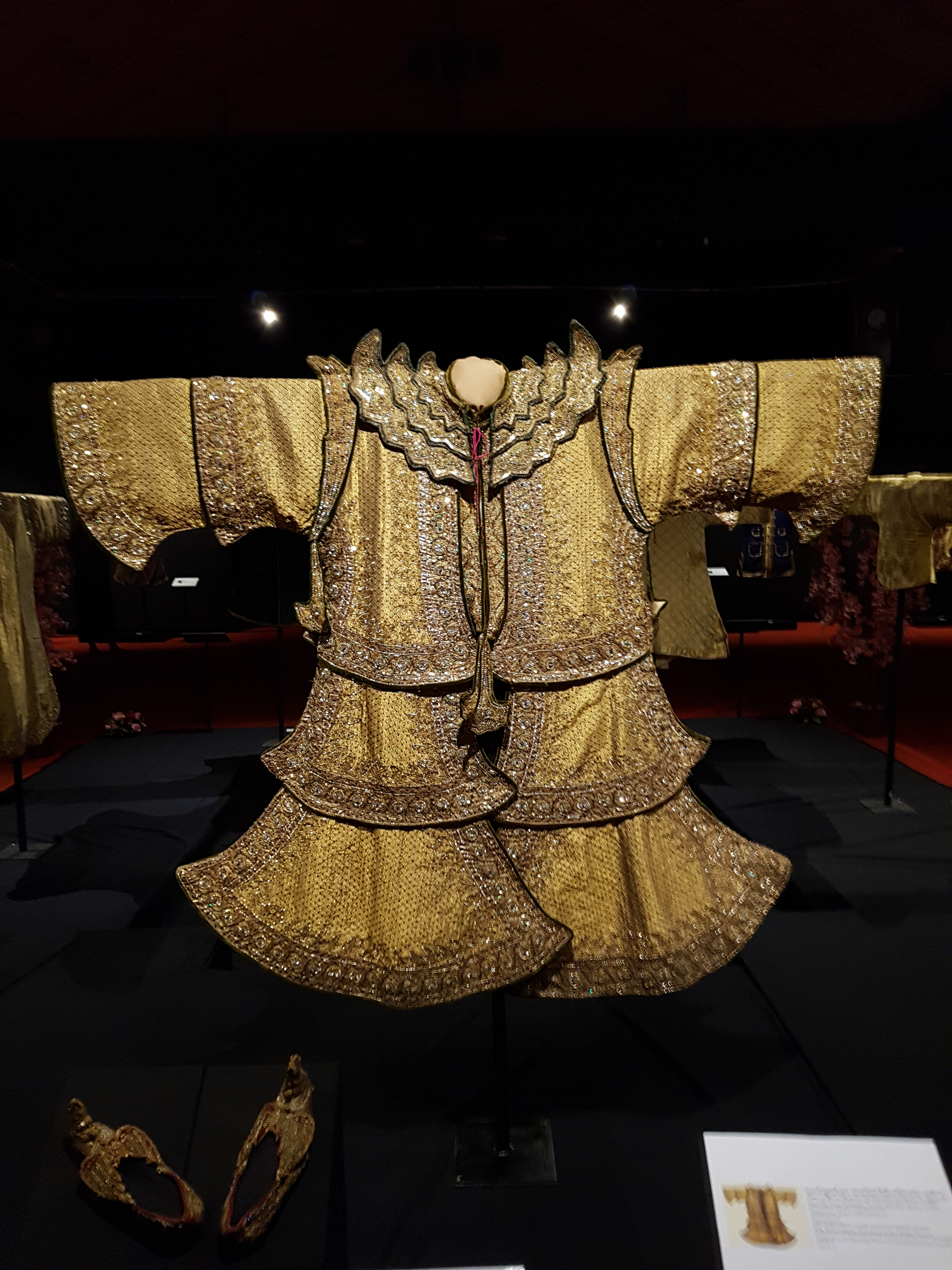
Tribute robe of Saopha Sao Maung (c. 1867)

The museum also stores and maintains a large collection of 138 costumes belonging to various Saophas, ministers and myosa governors of the area. In 2016, the museum considered sending them to France for restoration, but eventually decided to maintain and restore them within the country in partnership with the National Museum in Yangon. In June 2019, 30 of the costumes were shown in a rare exhibit at the National Museum before being returned to the Nyaungshwe Cultural Museum. The collection includes several pieces using materials sourced from faraway locations like England and the conservation process took 15 months.

== See also ==
- Shan State Cultural Museum
