= Kyon (disambiguation) =

Kyon is the protagonist of the Japanese franchise Haruhi Suzumiya.

Kyon may also refer to:

- Kyeon (Korean: 견), Korean surname
- Kyon Department, department of Sanguié Province, Burkina Faso
- Kyong (state), also known as Kyon, state in modern-day Myanmar
