= Kyawkku =

Kyawkku ကျောက်ဂူ Myinkyado
- Town
- Location in Burma
- Coordinates: 21°48′N 96°55′E
- Country: Burma
- Division: Shan State
- District: Taunggyi
- Township: Lawksawk
- Elevation: 1,019 m (3,342 ft)
- Time zone: UTC+6.30 (MST)

Kyawkku (Myinkyado) is a town in Shan State, Myanmar. It is part of Lawksawk Township of Taunggyi District.

== History ==
This village was the capital of Kyawkku State, one of the Shan States, until 1922.
