= Maw State =

Coordinates: 21°27′N 96°22′E

Maw
- State of the Shan States
- 1934
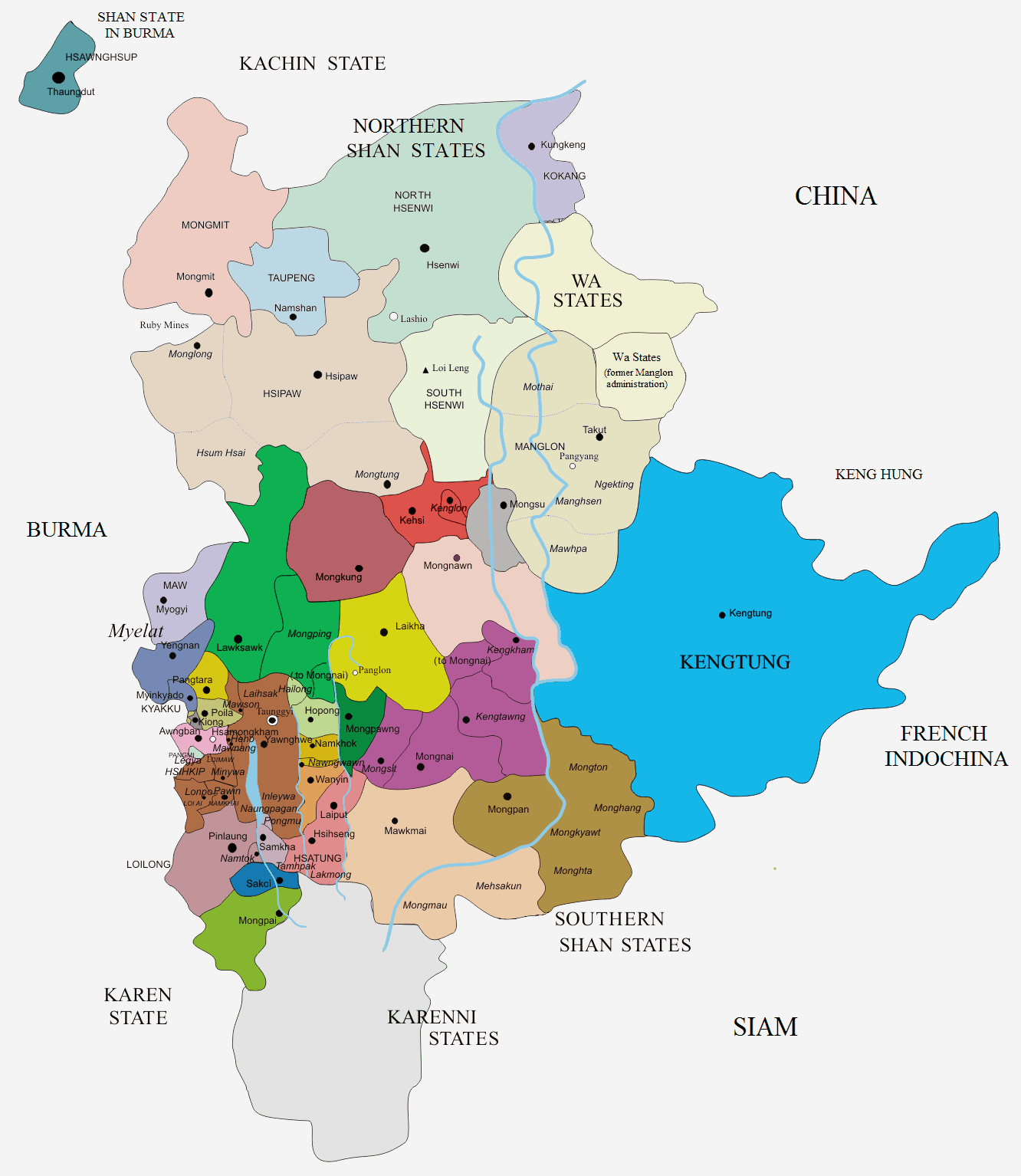
- Maw State (in violet) in a map of the Shan States
- Area
  - 1901: 885 km^{2} (342 sq mi)
- Population
  - 1901: 7,743
Succeeded by
Hsamonghkam

Maw (Burmese: Baw), was a Shan state in what is today Burma. It was the northernmost and the second largest of the states of the Myelat region at the western end of the Shan States.

The capital of the state and residence of the Ngwegunhmu was Myogyi, located on the western slopes of the westernmost range of the Shan Hills. Maw included the valley of the Zawgyi River and the Myelat plateau to the south. Its population was mostly Danu, but there were also Pa-O, Shan and Palaung people in the area.

== History ==
Maw was a tributary state to the King of Burma. In 1886 the ruler of Maw took part in the confederation against British rule in Burma, but he submitted quickly after British victory. Thus his possession of the territory was acknowledged by the colonial authorities in 1887. Maw State merged with Hsamönghkam State in 1934.

=== Rulers ===
The rulers bore the title Ngwegunhmu (silver revenue chief) until 1907.

==== Ngwegunhmus ====
- .... - .... Ko Thien Shin [1st ruler]
- .... - .... Thudewa
- .... - .... .... [12 rulers]
- .... - .... Maung Chwin
- 17.. - 1873 Maung Kya O
- 1873 - .... Maung Yit -Regent
- 1873 - 1907 Maung Nyo Hlaing (b. 1860 - d. 1921)
- .... - 1882 Maung On Gaing -Regent

==== Myosas ====
- 1907 - 1921 Maung Nyo Hlaing (s.a.)
- 1921 - 19.. Maung Thu Daw
