= Loilong =

Former Shan State in Burma

Coordinates: 20°07′02″N 96°46′58″E

Loilong (also known as Lwelong) was a Shan state in the Myelat region of what is today Burma. Its capital was Pinlaung. It had a large Pa-O population.
