= Linn Htut =

Burmese politician

His Excellency Dr Linn Htut
- လင်းထွဋ်

2nd Chief Minister of Shan State
- In office 30 March 2016 – 1 February 2021
- Appointed by: President of Myanmar
- President: Htin Kyaw
- Preceded by: Aung Myat
- Succeeded by: Kyaw Htun

Personal details
- Born: 1960 (age 65–66) Kyimyindaing Township; Yangon
- Party: National League for Democracy
- Children: Sai
- Education: Pathein Regional College
- Occupation: Politician, dentist
- Cabinet: Shan State Government

Lin Htut (Burmese: လင်းထွဋ်) is a Burmese politician who served as Chief Minister of Shan State from 2016 to 2021.

== Early life and education ==
He was born in Maubin Township, Ayeyarwady Division, in 1960. He studied biology and agriculture at Pathein Regional College and started studying dentistry in 1980. He worked as a dentist at Kutkai Hospital in northern Shan State in 1988, then transferred to Lashio General Hospital in 1994. In 2006, he was dismissed and his medical licence suspended after he refused a promotion and transfer order.

== Career ==
He said he has supported the NLD since seeing Aung San Suu Kyi give a public speech in People's Park in 1988. He became a party member after retiring from his government posts in 2015.

In the wake of the 2021 Myanmar coup d'état on 1 February, Linn Htut was detained by the Myanmar Armed Forces. Linn's wife was placed under house arrest in the state minister’s residence in Taunggyi. On 28 January 2022, he was charged with four counts of corruption and sentenced to 16 years imprisonment.
