= Kyong (state) =

Former Shan state in Myanmar

Coordinates: 20°47′21″N 96°38′58″E

Kyong State
- State of the Shan States
- Before 18th century–1959
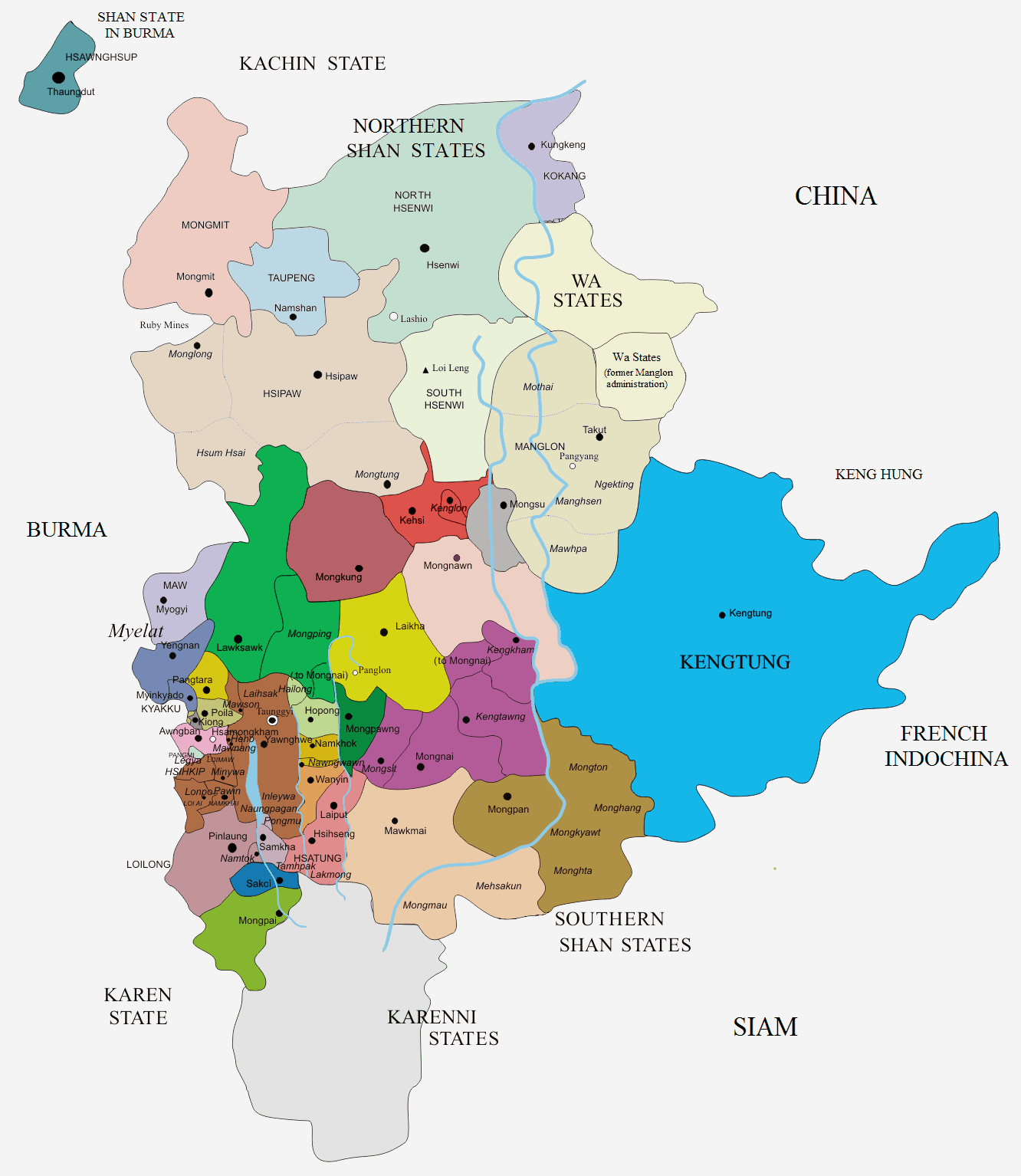
- Kyong State in a map of the Shan States
- Area
  - 1901 Census of India: 21 km^{2} (8.1 sq mi)
- Population
  - 1901 Census of India: 2,340
- History
  - Tributary of the Konbaung Dynasty: Before 18th century
  - Abdication of the last Ngwegunhmu: 1959
Preceded by	Succeeded by
Kingdom of Burma	Shan State

Kyong (also known as Kyon) was a Shan state in the Myelat region of what is today Burma.

== Rulers ==
The title of Kyong's rulers was Ngwegunhmu.

- .... - .... Maung Aung Hla
- .... - 1867 Maung San Nyun
- 1867 - .... Maung Po (b. 1841 - d. ....)
- c.1910 Maung Kaing
