= Mawnang =

Coordinates: 20°43′24″N 96°46′16″E

Mawnang (also known as Bawnin) was a small Shan state in the Myelat region of what is today Burma. Its population was mostly Taungyo.

== History ==
=== Rulers ===
The rulers of Mawnang bore the title of Myoza.

- .... - .... Hkam Hon [1st ruler]
- .... - .... Nam Hkam Lin
- .... - .... Maung Ne Dun
- .... - .... Maung Kut
- .... - .... Maung Kye
- .... - .... Maung La
- .... - .... Sao Ta
- .... - 1736 Maung Saung
- 1736 - 1752 Ye Tut
- 1752 - 1766 Tha Son
- 1766 - c.1767 Maung Myat (1st time)
- c.1767 - 1774 Vacant
- 1774 - .... Maung Myat (2nd time)
- .... - .... Naw Hkam Lin
- .... - .... Maung Kaung
- .... - .... Maung Pot
- .... - .... Maung Maung
- .... - 1883 Hkun Hkam
- 1883 - 1886 Hkun Shwe Hkam -Regent
- 1886 - Apr 1907 Sao Hkim (b. 1851 - d. 1907)
- Apr 1907 - 19.. Hkun Ti (b. 1886 - d. 19..)
