= Wanyin =

Former Shan state in Myanmar

Coordinates: 20°27′56″N 97°13′37″E

Wanyin was a Shan state in what is today Burma. It belonged to the Central Division of the Southern Shan States.
