= Pindaya =

Town in Danu Self-Administered Zone, Myanmar

Pindaya ပင်းတယမြို့ Pìñṯáyá myoú
- Town
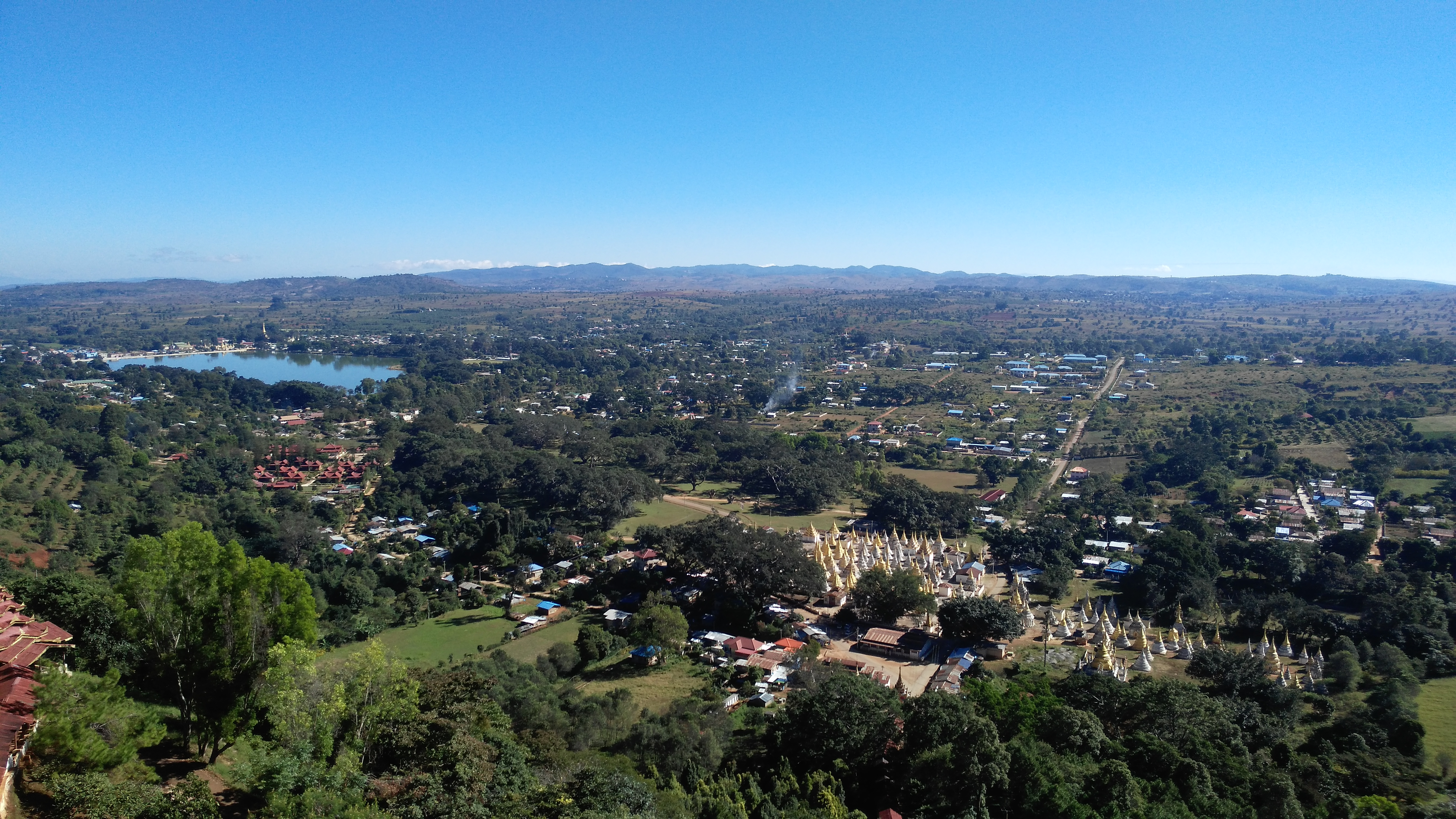

- Location in Myanmar
- Coordinates: 20°57′0″N 96°40′0″E
- Country: Myanmar
- State: Shan
- Division: Danu Self-Administered Zone
- Township: Pindaya Township

Population
  - Religions: Buddhism
- Time zone: UTC+6.30 (MMT)

Pindaya (Burmese: ပင်းတယမြို့ Pìñṯáyá myoú) is the capital of the Danu Self-Administered Zone in Shan State, east-central Myanmar. It is located in Pindaya Township. Mainly famous for its limestone caves called Pindaya Caves where thousands of Buddha images have been consecrated for worship over the centuries, it is also one of the towns that host an itinerant market every fifth day.

== Attractions ==
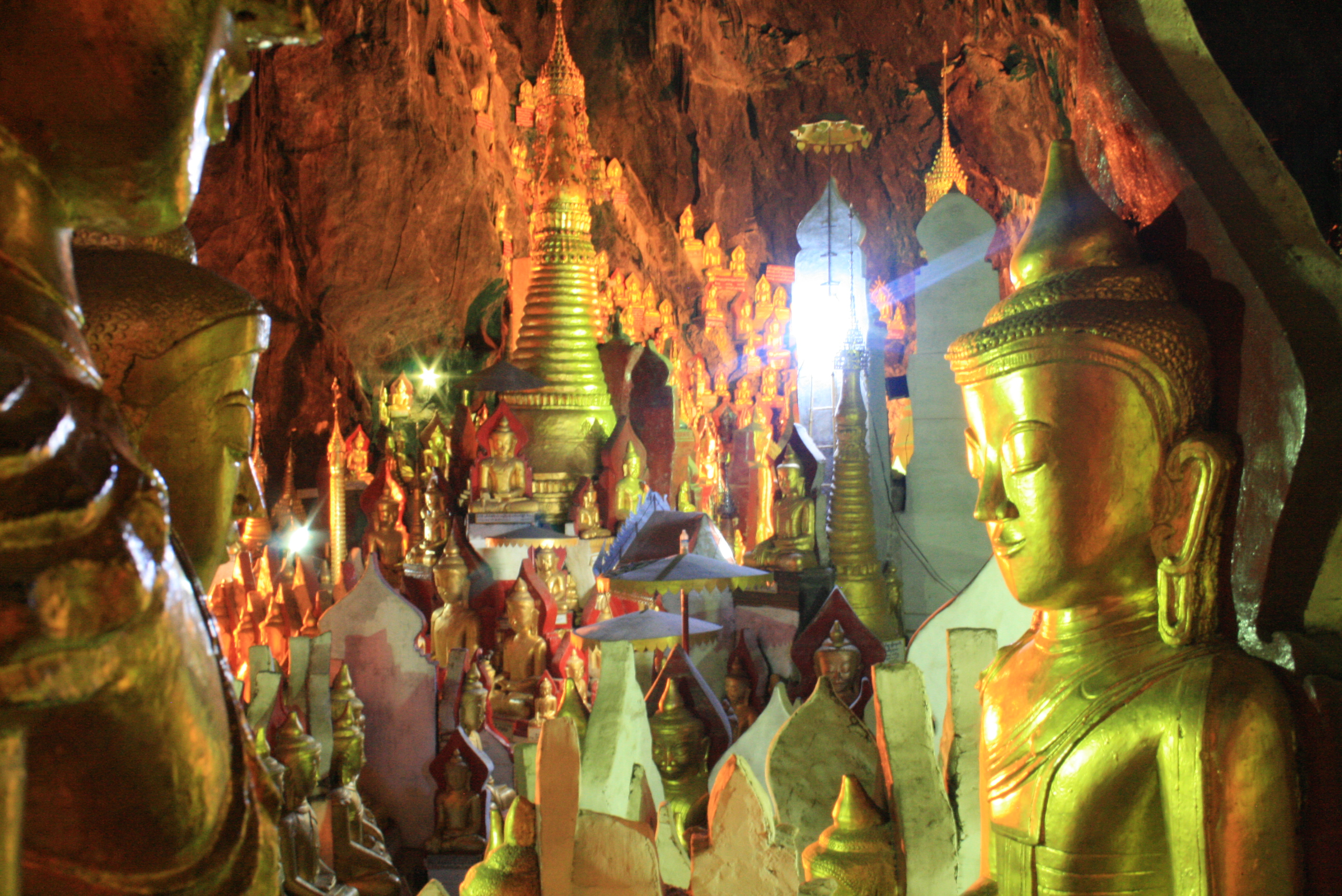
Inside Pindaya Cave, 2010

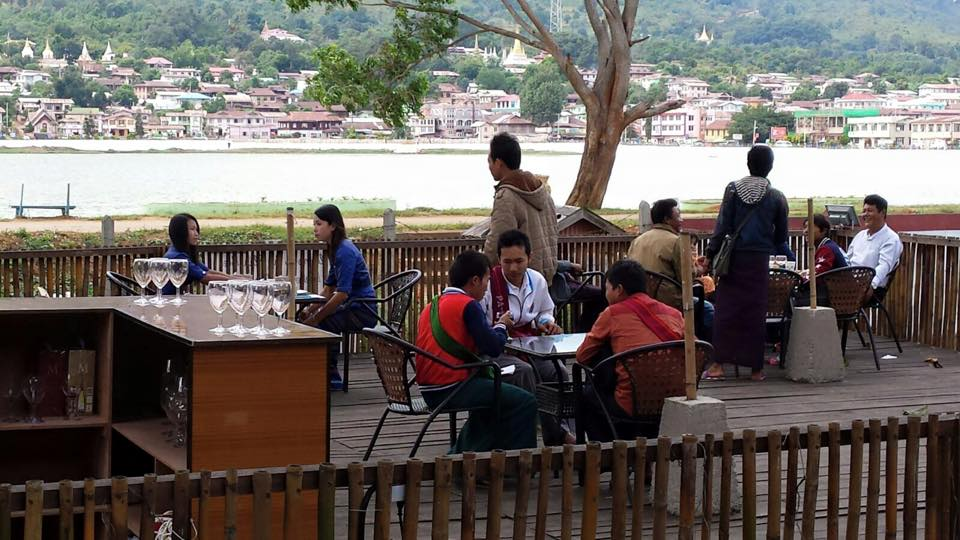
Outside seating at PlanBee Beekeeping Center

The Pindaya Caves, located approximately a 45-minute walk from the town, are among its best-known tourist attractions. Another attraction is the PlanBee Beekeeping Center. Visitors can sample and purchase locally produced honey and other bee products, as well as enjoy coffee and views of Pone Taloke Lake.

The Danu Self-Administered Zone is administered by a Leading Body, which is located in Pindaya.
