= Poila =

State in Burma, with Taungyo, Danu and Pa-O tribes as its inhabitants

Coordinates: 20°50′41″N 96°40′59″E

Poila (also known as Pwehla) was a Shan state in the Myelat region of what is today Burma. Its population was mostly Taungyo, with the remainder being Danu and Pa-O.
