= Loimaw =

Former Shan state, Myanmar

Coordinates: 20°27′16″N 96°44′37″E

Loimaw (also known as Lwemaw) was a Shan state in the Myelat region of what is today Burma. Its capital was Minywa. Its population was mostly Pa-O.
