= Danu Self-Administered Zone =

Coordinates: 20°48′48″N 96°39′07″E

Danu Self-Administered Zone ဓနုကိုယ်ပိုင်အုပ်ချုပ်ခွင့်ရဒေသ
- Self-administered zone
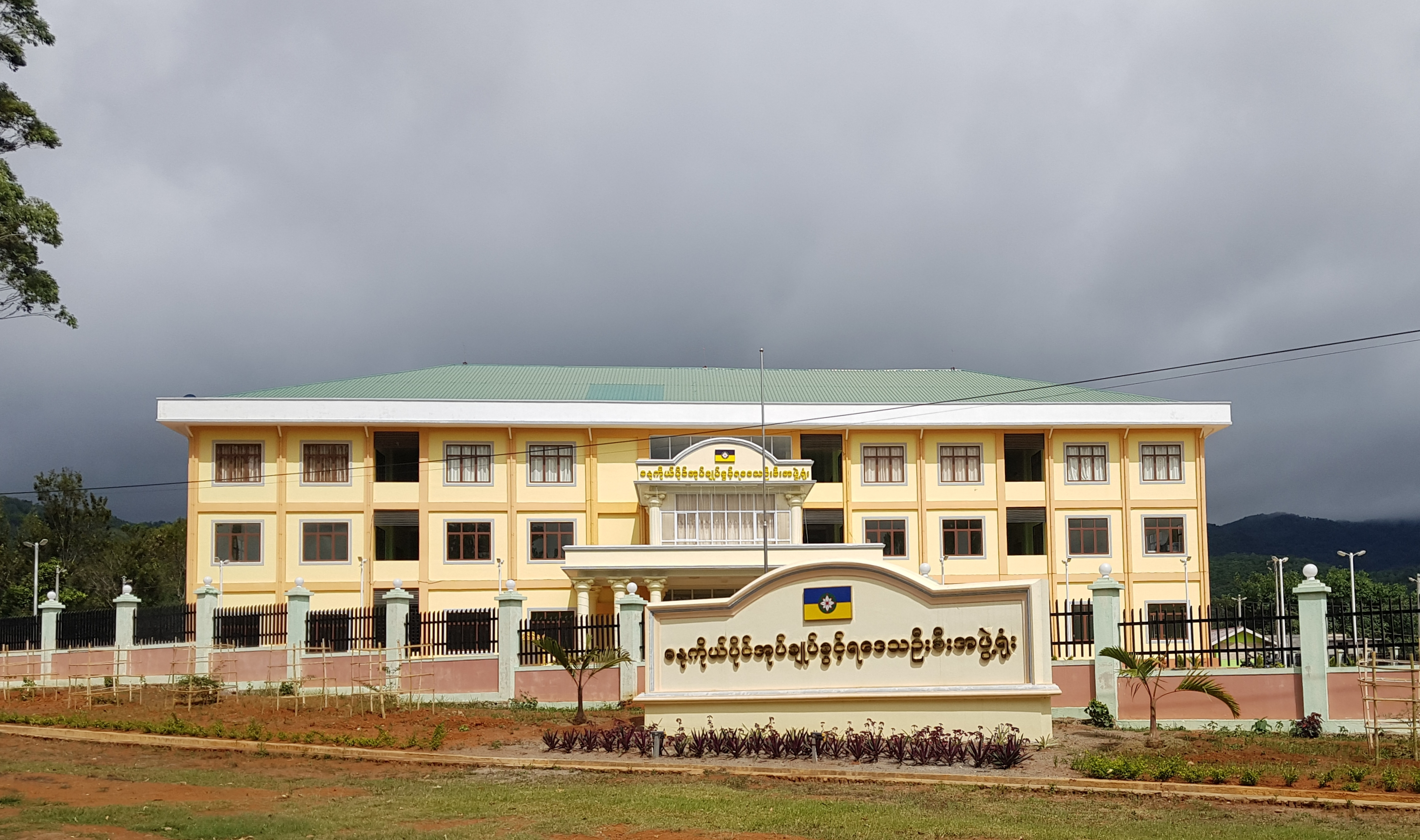
- Headquarters of the Leading Body

- Flag

- Location in Shan State
- Country: Myanmar
- State: Shan State
- No. of Townships: 2
- Established: 20 August 2010
- Capital: Pindaya

Government
  - Chairperson of the Leading Body: Arker Lin

Area
  - Total: 3,610.6 km^{2} (1,394.1 sq mi)

Population (2014)
  - Total: 161,835
- Demonym: Danu
- Time zone: UTC+6.30 (MMT)

The Danu Self-Administered Zone (Burmese: ဓနု ကိုယ်ပိုင်အုပ်ချုပ်ခွင့်ရ ဒေသ [dənṵ kòbàɪɰ̃ ʔoʊʔtɕʰoʊʔ kʰwɪ̰ɰ̃ja̰ dèθa̰]), as stipulated by the 2008 Constitution of Myanmar, is a self-administered zone consisting of two townships in Shan State. The zone is self-administered by the Danu people. Its official name was announced by decree on 20 August 2010.

== Government and politics ==
The Danu Self-Administered Zone is administered by the Leading Body of the Danu Self-Administered Zone (LBDSAZ), which consists of at least ten members and includes Shan State Assembly members elected from the Zone and members nominated by the Myanmar Armed Forces. The Leading Body performs both executive and legislative functions and is led by a Chairperson, currently Arker Lin. The Leading Body has competence in ten areas of policy, including urban and rural development, road construction and maintenance, and public health.

== Administrative divisions ==
The zone is divided into two townships:

- Pindaya Township
- Ywangan Township

Both townships are administratively part of the Taunggyi District.
