= Mawson State =

Former Shan state

Coordinates: 20°57′00″N 96°46′16″E

Mawson (also known as Bawzaing) was a Shan state in the Myelat region of what is today Burma. Its capital was Mawson. Its population consisted of Danu, Pa-O, and Taungyo.
