= Hsatung =

Former Shan state in Myanmar

Coordinates: 20°09′40″N 97°15′09″E

Hsatung (also known as Hsahtung or Thaton) was a Shan state in what is today Burma.

Hsatung was a tributary of Burma until 1887, when the Shan states submitted to British rule after the fall of the Konbaung dynasty. The capital was formerly Laip but then was moved to Hsihseng, Nam Pawn valley, about 70 km south of Hopong. It became a part of the unified Shan State within Burma in 1947. Sao Aung Myint, the last real myoza of Hsatung, died in the 1940s. His son abdicated and surrendered his powers to the Burmese government on 29 April 1959. The current population consists mostly of Taungu, with the Shan being a minority ethnic group.
