= Namhkai =

Historical region in Myanmar

Coordinates: 20°35′56″N 96°03′43″E

Namhkai (also known as Nanke) was a Shan state in the Myelat region of what is today Burma. Its capital was Paw-in. Its population was almost entirely Pa-O.
