= Pindaya Township =

Pindaya Township ပင်းတယမြို့နယ်
- Township
- Pinday Township (red) in the Danu Self-Administered Zone
- Country: Myanmar
- State: Shan
- Division: Danu Self-Administered Zone
- Capital: Pindaya

Area
  - Total: 254.89 sq mi (660.2 km^{2})

Population
  - Total: 86,993
- Time zone: UTC+6:30 (MMT)

Pindaya Township (Burmese: ပင်းတယမြို့နယ်; also spelled Pingdaya or Pangtara) is a township located within the Danu Self-Administered Zone, Shan State, Myanmar. The principal town is Pindaya. The township also contains 137 villages grouped into 27 village tracts. Prior to 2008 it was part of Taunggyi District.
