= Shan State Government =

- Flag of Shan State

Government overview
- Formed: 1 April 2011 (5 years, renewable once)
- Jurisdiction: Shan State Hluttaw (Parliament)
- Headquarters: Taunggyi, Shan State
- Government executive: Linn Htut, Chief Minister
- Parent department: Government of Myanmar
- Website: www.shanstate.gov.mm

Shan State Government is the cabinet of Shan State in Myanmar. The cabinet is led by chief minister, Dr. Linn Htut.

== Cabinet ==
=== Linn Htut's Cabinet (1 April 2016 - 31 March 2021) ===
No.	Name	Portfolio	Political Party
(1)	Dr. Linn Htut	Chief Minister	National League for Democracy
(2)	Colonel; Naing Win Aung	Minister of Security and Border Affairs	Myanmar Military
(3)	Sai Som Chai	Minister of Municipality Affairs	National League for Democracy
(4)	Sai Long Kyaw	Minister of Agriculture and Livestock	Union Solidarity and Development Party
(5)	Dr. Nyi Nyi Aung	Minister of Forestry	National League for Democracy
(6)	Swe Thein	Minister of Electricity and Industry	National League for Democracy
(7)	Khun Ye Htwe	Minister of Transportation	Union Solidarity and Development Party
(8)	Soe Nyunt Lwin	Minister of Planning	National League for Democracy
(9)	Sai Seng Tip Long	Minister of Finance	National League for Democracy
(10)	Dr. Fu Ai Xiang	Minister of Social Affairs	Union Solidarity and Development Party
(11)	Zoute Daung	Minister of Kachin Ethnic Affairs	Independent
(12)	Gu Sar	Minister of Lisu Ethnic Affairs	Lisu National Development Party
(13)	Khun Aye Maung	Minister of Kayan Ethnic Affairs	National League for Democracy
(14)	Dr. Aung Than Maung	Minister of Bamar Ethnic Affairs	Union Solidarity and Development Party
(15)	Yaw Thet	Minister of Lahu Ethnic Affairs	Lahu National Development Party
(16)	Ah Bei Hla	Minister of Akha Ethnic Affairs	Akha National Development Party
(17)	Dr. Tun Haling	Minister of Intha Ethnic Affairs	National League for Democracy

=== Sao Aung Myat's Cabinet(1 April 2011 - 31 March 2016) ===
No.	Name	Portfolio	Political Party
(1)	Sao Aung Myat	Chief Minister	Union Solidarity and Development Party
(2)	Colonel;	Minister of Security and Border Affairs	Myanmar Military
(3)		Minister of Municipality Affairs	Union Solidarity and Development Party
(4)		Minister of Agriculture and Livestock	Union Solidarity and Development Party
(5)		Minister of Forestry	Union Solidarity and Development Party
(6)	Sai Ai Pao	Minister of Electricity and Industry	Shan Nationalities Democratic Party
(7)	Sai Naw Kham	Minister of Transportation	Shan Nationalities Democratic Party
(8)		Minister of Planning	Union Solidarity and Development Party
(9)		Minister of Finance	Union Solidarity and Development Party
(10)		Minister of Social Affairs	Union Solidarity and Development Party
(11)		Minister of Kachin Ethnic Affairs	
(12)		Minister of Lisu Ethnic Affairs	
(13)		Minister of Kayan Ethnic Affairs	
(14)		Minister of Bamar Ethnic Affairs	Union Solidarity and Development Party
(15)		Minister of Lahu Ethnic Affairs	
(16)		Minister of Akha Ethnic Affairs	
(17)		Minister of Intha Ethnic Affairs	
