= Ywangan Township =

Township in Danu Self-Administered Zone, Myanmar

Ywangan Township ရွာငံမြို့နယ်
- Township
- Ywangan Township (red) in the Danu Self-Administered Zone
- Coordinates: 21.1628°N 96.4422°E
- Country: Myanmar
- State: Shan
- Division: Danu Self-Administered Zone
- Capital: Pindaya
- Time zone: UTC+6:30 (MMT)

Ywangan Township (Burmese: ရွာငံမြို့နယ်, Burmese pronunciation: [jwɑ̀.ŋɑ̀ɰ̃ mjo̼.nɛ̀]) is a township in northern Danu Self-Administered Zone, western Shan State, Myanmar. The principal town is Ywangan.

Information concerning this region is not easily accessible, although quality coffee is grown in the region.
