= Hsamönghkam State =

Hsamönghkam (also known as Thamaingkan) was a Shan state in the Myelat region of Burma. Its capital was Aungpan.

Hsamönghkam was established before 1700 CE. During the 18th and 19th centuries it was a tributary of Burma. In 1886, following the fall of the Konbaung dynasty, it submitted to British rule. It became a part of the unified Shan State within Burma in 1947.

Sao Htun Aye, The last myosa of Hsamönghkam, abdicated and surrendered his powers to the Burmese government on 29 April 1959.
