= Bamar people =

Ethnic group in Southeast Asia

Bamar
ဗမာလူမျိုး ba. ma lu myui:
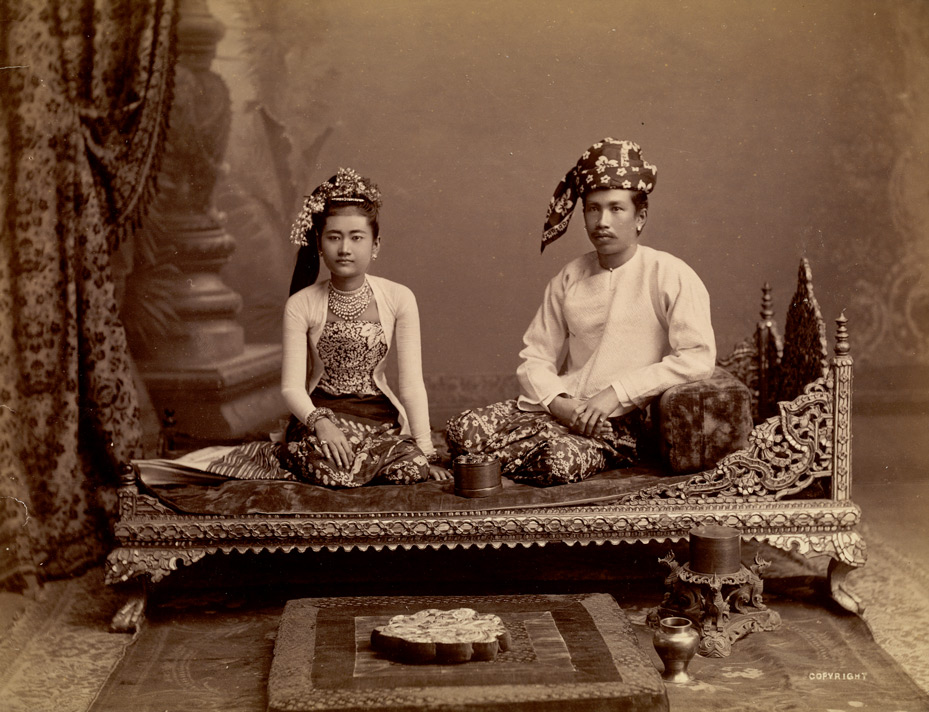
- A Bamar couple in the 1890s

Regions with significant populations
- Myanmar: 35,077,800
- Thailand: 2,300,000
- Singapore: 50,000
- Australia: 32,655
- Japan: 28,860

Languages
- Burmese

Religion
- Majority:- Theravada Buddhism • Burmese folk religion Minority:- Christianity • Islam • Hinduism

Related ethnic groups
- Danu; Intha; Rakhine; Marma; Achang; Yi; Other Tibeto-Burman-speaking peoples

The Bamar people (Burmese: ဗမာလူမျိုး, ba. ma lu myui: IPA: [bə.mà lù mjó]; also known as Burmese people or Burmans) are a Tibeto-Burman-speaking ethnic group native to Myanmar (formerly known as Burma). With an estimated population of around 35 million people, they are the largest ethnic group in Myanmar, accounting for 68.78% of the country's total population. The geographic homeland of the Bamar is the Irrawaddy River basin. The Bamar speak the Burmese language, which serves as the national language and lingua franca of Myanmar.

== Ethnonyms ==
In the Burmese language, Bamar (ဗမာ, also transcribed Bama) and Myanmar (မြန်မာ, also transliterated Mranma and transcribed Myanma) (Note: Burmese: မြန်မာ လူမျိုး, MLCTS: myan. ma lu myui:, Burmese pronunciation: [myanmà lùmjó]) have historically been interchangeable endonyms. Burmese is a diglossic language; "Bamar" is the diglossic low form of "Myanmar," which is the diglossic high equivalent. The term "Myanmar" is extant to the early 1100s, first appearing on a stone inscription, where it was used as a cultural identifier, and has continued to be used in this manner. From the onset of British colonial rule to the Japanese occupation of Burma, "Bamar" was used in Burmese to refer to both the country and its majority ethnic group. Since the country achieved independence in 1948, "Myanmar" has been officially used to designate both the nation-state, its official language and majority ethnic group, but the ethnic group was renamed to "Bamar" in 1980 by the order of General Ne Win. In spoken usage, "Bamar" and "Myanmar" remain interchangeable, especially with respect to referencing the language and country.

In the English language, the Bamar are known by a number of exonyms, including Burmans and Burmese, both of which were interchangeably used by the British. (Note: Historical spellings include 'Birman'.) In June 1989, in an attempt to indigenise both the country's place names and ethnonyms, the military government changed the official English names of the country (from Burma to Myanmar), the language (from Burmese to Myanmar), and the country's majority ethnic group (from Burmans to Bamar).

== Ancestral origins ==
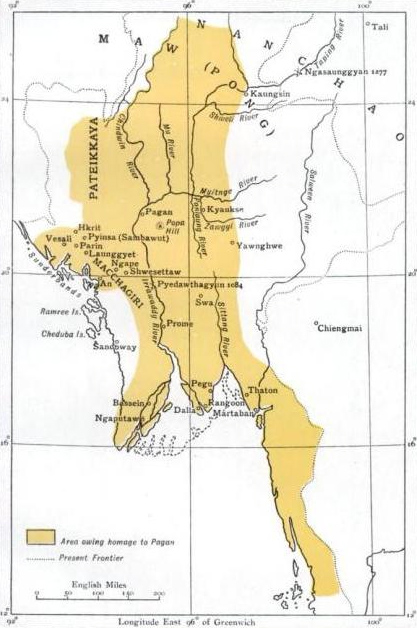
The extent of the 11th century Pagan Empire under Anawrahta

The Bamar continue to inhabit the fertile low-lying river valleys in the centre of Myanmar (in orange).

The Bamar's northern origins are evidenced by the extant distribution of Burmish languages to the north of the country, and the fact that taung (တောင်), the Burmese word for 'south' also means 'mountain,' which suggests that at one point ancestors of the Bamar lived north of the mountains. Until a thousand years ago, ancestors of the Bamar and Yi were much more widespread across Yunnan, Guizhou, southern Sichuan, and northern Burma. (Note: The Tanguts of Western Xia (to the north of Yunnan around this time) spoke a Tibeto-Burman language that may also have been close to Burmese-Yi. Going further back in time, the people of the ancient kingdom of Sanxingdui in Sichuan (in the 12th–11th centuries BCE) were probably ancestral to later Tibeto-Burman groups and perhaps even more narrowly, to the ancestors of the Burmese-Yi speakers at Dian and Yelang.) During the Han dynasty in China, Yunnan was ruled primarily by the Burmese-Yi speaking Dian and Yelang kingdoms. During the Tang dynasty in China, Yunnan and northern Burma were ruled by the Burmese-Yi speaking Nanzhao kingdom.

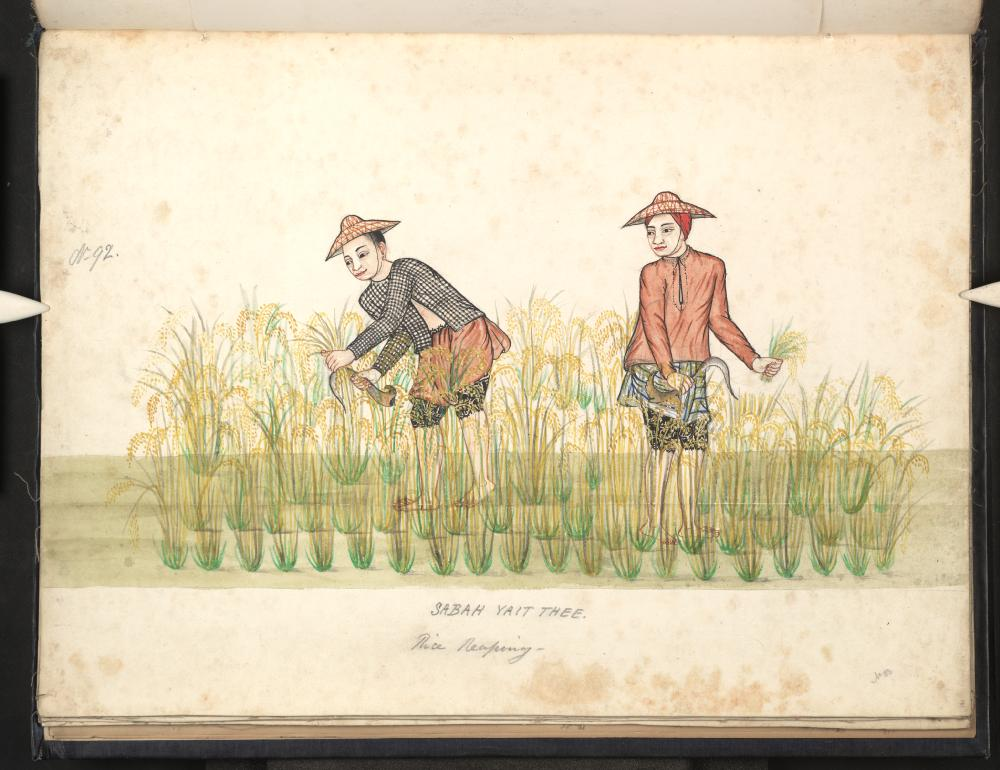
Wet rice cultivation is closely associated with the Bamar.

Between the 600s and 800s, the Bamars migrated from their original homeland in Tibet to settle present-day Myanmar, establishing settlements along the Irrawaddy (Ayeyarwady) and Salween (Thanlwin) Rivers and founding the outpost of Pagan (Bagan). The Bamar gradually settled in the fertile Irrawaddy and Salween river valleys that were home to Pyu city-states, where they established the Pagan Kingdom. Between the 1050s to 1060s, King Anawrahta founded the Pagan Empire, for the first time unifying the Irrawaddy valley and its periphery under one polity. By the 1100s, the Burmese language and culture had become dominant in the upper Irrawaddy valley, eclipsing Pyu (formerly called Tircul) and Pali norms. Conventional Burmese chronicles state that the Pyu were assimilated into the Bamar population.

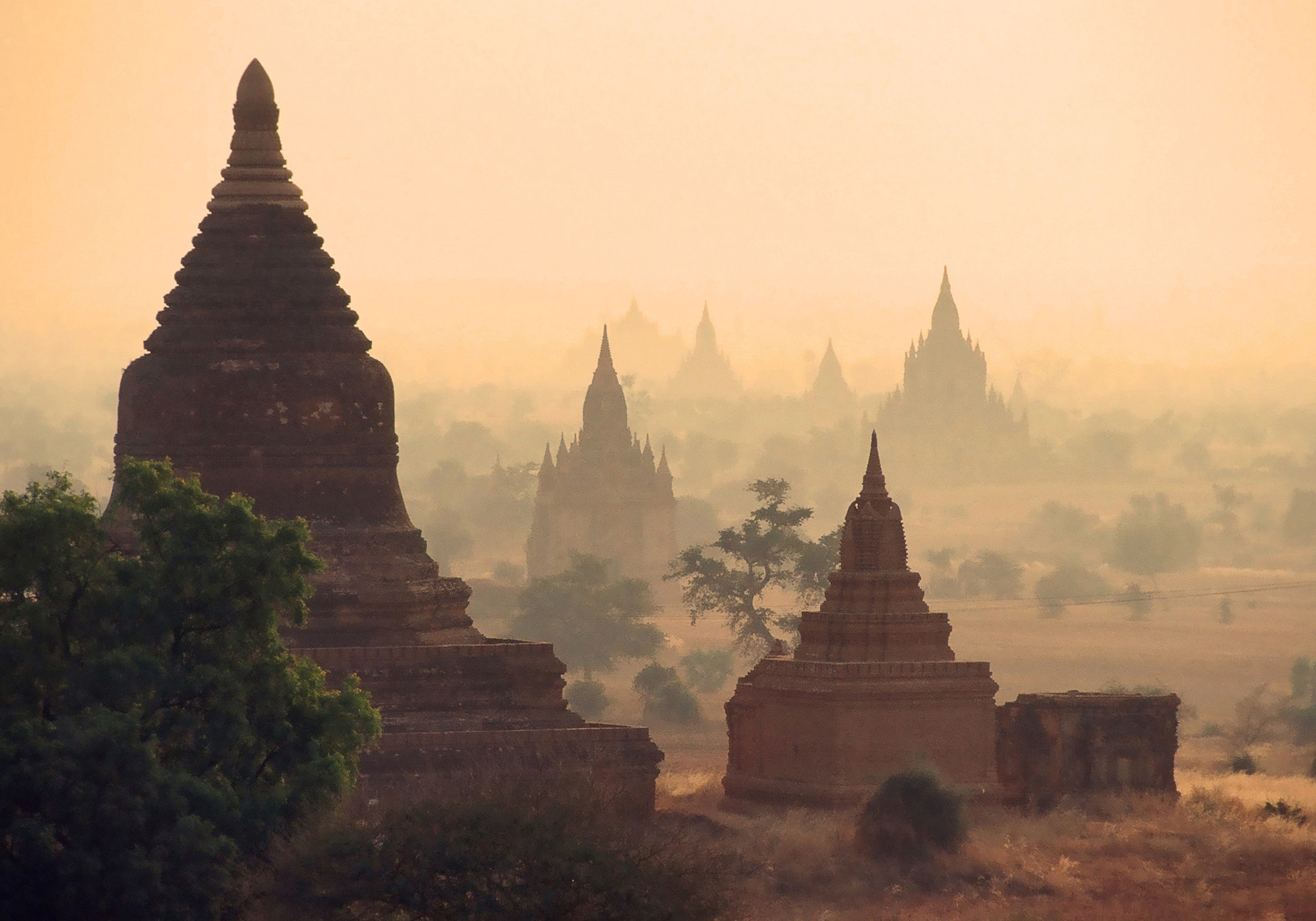
Old Bagan

By the 1200s, Bamar settlements were found as far south as Mergui (Myeik) and Tenasserim (Taninthayi), whose inhabitants continue to speak archaic Burmese dialects. Beginning in the 900s, Burmese speakers began migrating westward, crossing the Arakan Mountains and settling in what is now Rakhine State. By the 1100s, they had consolidated control of the region, becoming a tributary state of the Pagan Empire until the 13th century. Over time, these Bamar migrants formed a distinct cultural identity, becoming the Rakhine people (also known as the Arakanese).

== Genetics ==
A 2014 DNA analysis found that the Bamar exhibited 'extraordinary' genetic diversity, with 80 different mitochondrial lineages and indications of recent demographic expansion. As the Bamar expanded their presence in the region following their arrival by the 800s, they likely incorporated older haplogroups including those of the Pyu and Mon. Another genetic study of G6PD mutations in Mon and Bamar men found that the two groups likely share a common ancestry, despite speaking languages that belong to different language families. Another 2022 study found that Central and Southern Thais had a large proportion of Bamar-related ancestry (at 24% and 11% respectively), while Bamar ancestry was also detected among the Palaung and Shan groups.

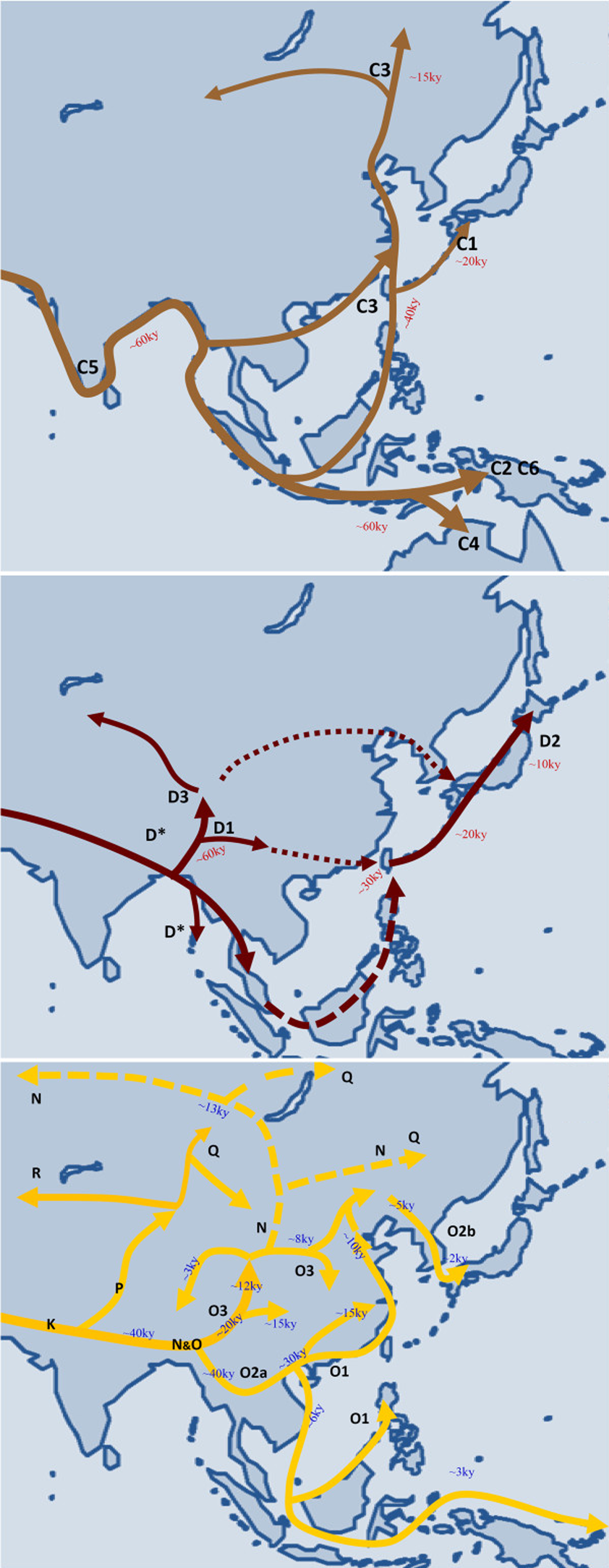
Migration routes of major Y-chromosome DNA haplogroups in East and Southeast Asia.

Y-chromosome DNA haplogroups

Y-DNA traces paternal ancestry and is inherited through the male line. The Bamar are linguistically classified as Tibeto-Burman, part of the Sino-Tibetan language family. Their Y-DNA (especially haplogroup O2 and O1b) reflects historical migration from China and Tibet, possibly via the Irrawaddy River basin.

== Ethnic identity ==
Modern-day Bamar identity remains permeable and dynamic and is generally distinguished by language and religion, i.e., the Burmese language and Theravada Buddhism. There is considerable variation among individuals who identify as Bamar, and members of other ethnic groups, particularly the Mon, Shan, Karen, and Sino-Burmese, self-identify as Bamar to various degrees, some to the extent of complete assimilation. To this day, the Burmese language does not have precise terminology that distinguishes the European concepts of race, ethnicity and religion; the term lu-myo (လူမျိုး, lit. 'type of person') can reference all three. For instance, many Bamar self-identify as members of the 'Buddhist lu-myo' or the 'Myanmar lu-myo,' which has posed a significant challenge for census-takers.

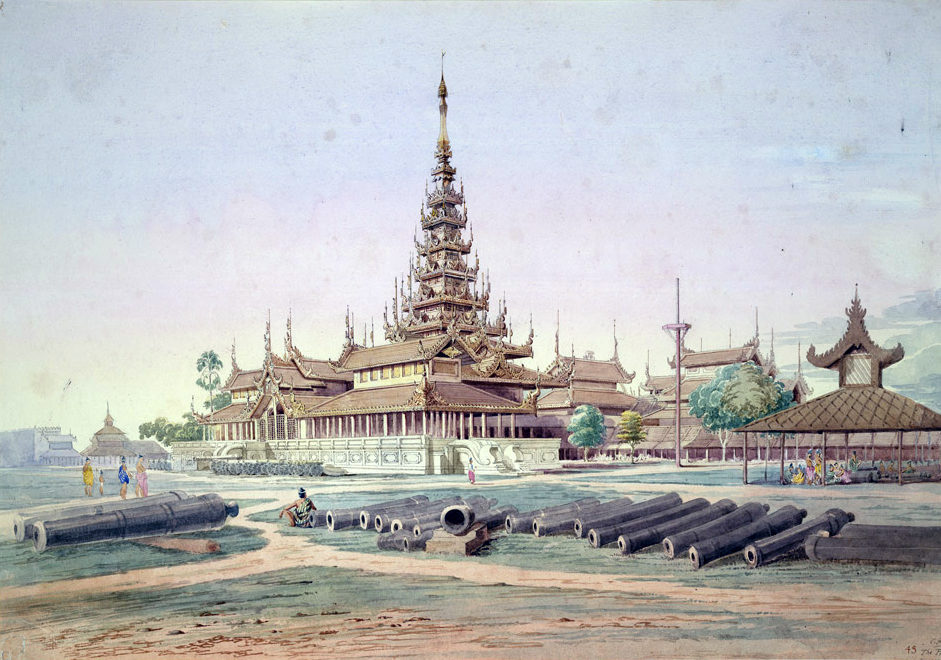
Amarapura Palace

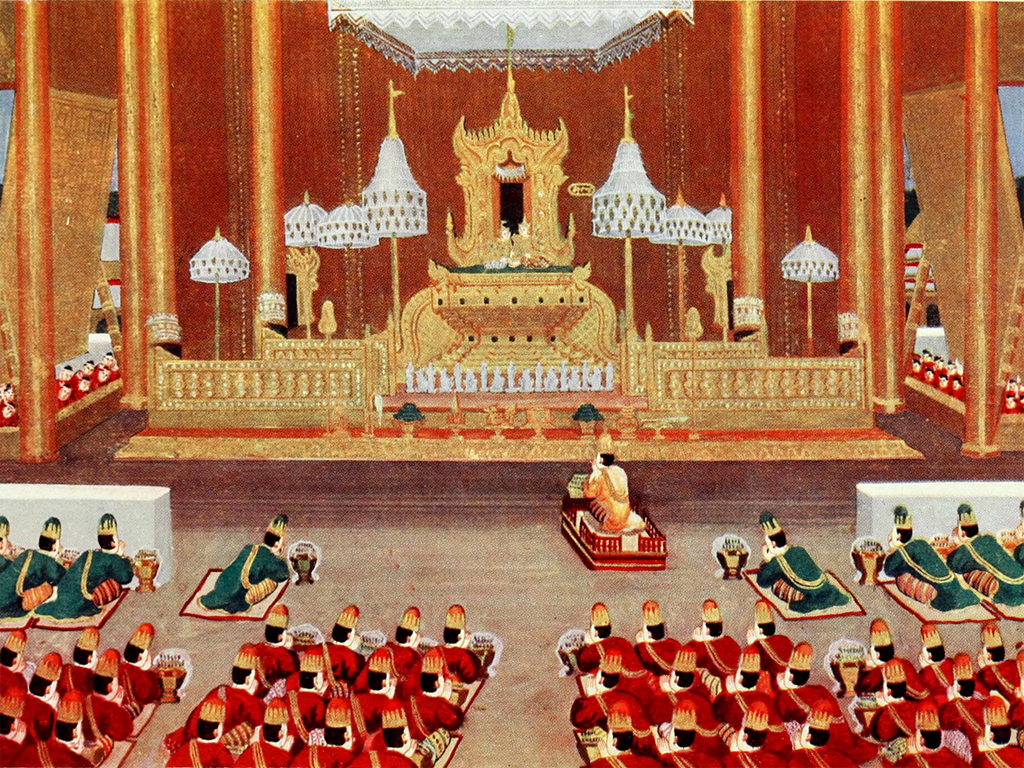
Saya Chone's "Royal Audience," a traditional painting depicting the Mandalay Palace's royal audience hall

In the pre-colonial era, ethnic identity was fluid and dynamic, marked by patron-client relationships, religion, and regional origins. Consequently, many non-Bamar assimilated and adopted a Bamar identity and norms for sociopolitical purposes. Between the 1500s and 1800s, the notion of Bamar identity expanded significantly, driven by intermarriage with other communities and voluntary changes in self-identification, especially in Mon and Shan-speaking regions. Bamar identity was also more inclusive in the precolonial era, especially during 1700s when Konbaung kings embarked on major territorial expansion campaigns, to Manipur, Assam, Mrauk U, and Pegu. These campaigns paralleled those in other Southeast Asian kingdoms, such as Vietnam's southward expansion (Nam tiến), which wrested control of the Mekong delta from the Champa during the same period.

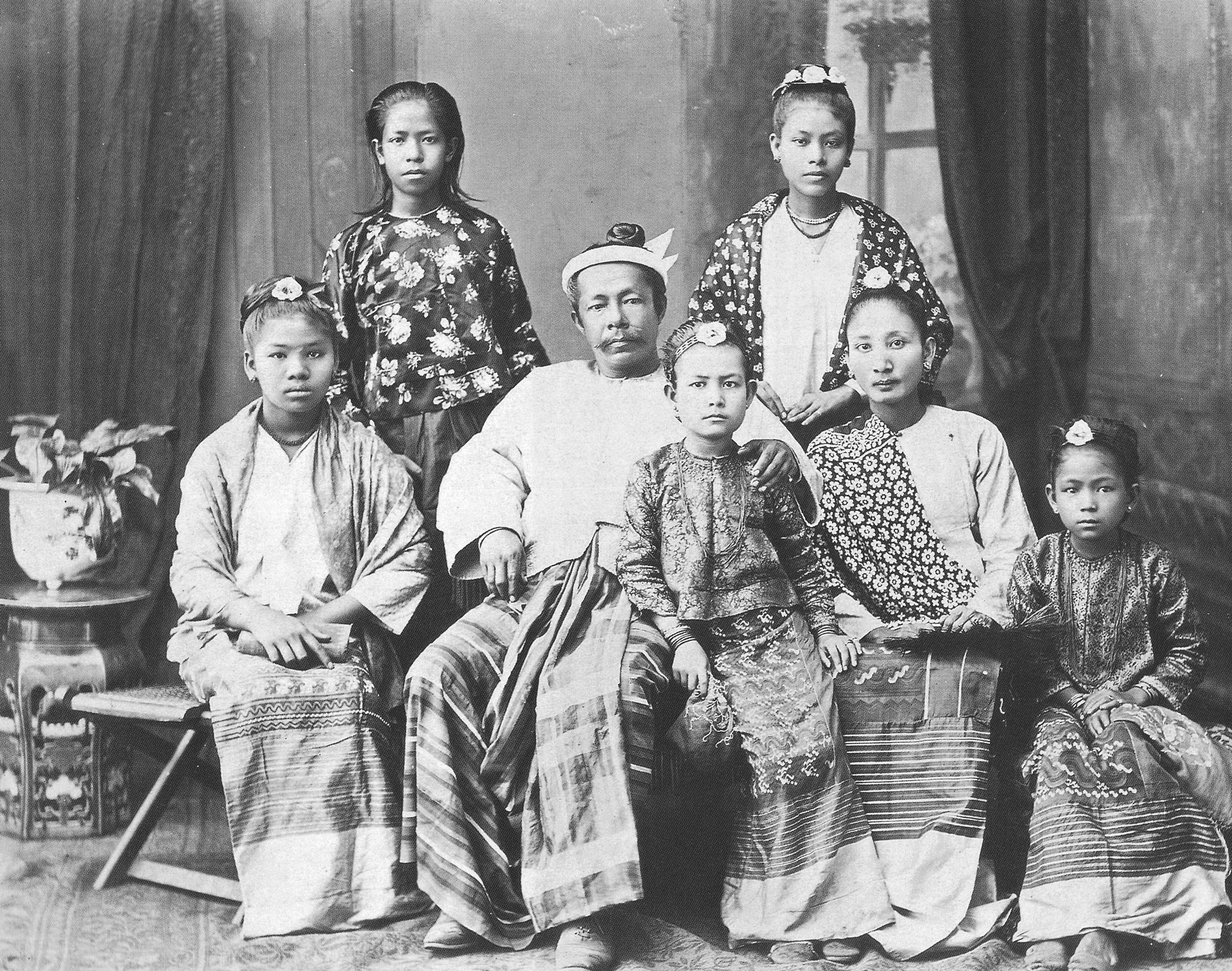
Portrait of a Bamar family at the turn of the 20th century, during British rule

During the early 1900s, a narrower strain of Bamar nationalism developed in response to British colonial rule, which failed to address Bamar grievances and actively marginalised the Bamar from entering public occupations such as educational and military ones. One of the primary Bamar grievances with British colonial rule was the widespread immigration of non-Bamar people from other parts of British India, which was perceived as transforming the Bamar people into a minority on their own homeland. In 1925, all Bamar military personnel serving in the British Indian Army were discharged, and the colonial authorities adopted an exclusionary policy which stipulated that only the Chin, Kachin and Karen minorities would be targeted for military recruitment. By 1930, leading Burmese nationalist group the Dobama Asiayone had emerged, from which independence leaders like U Nu and Aung San would launch their political careers. For most of its colonial history, Burma was administered as a province of British India. It was not until 1937 that Burma was formally separated and became directly administered by the British Crown, after a long struggle for direct colonial representation.

=== Government classification ===
The Burmese government officially classifies nine 'sub-ethnic groups' under the Bamar 'national race.' Of these nine groups, the Bamar, Dawei (Tavoyan), Myeik or Beik (Merguese), Yaw, and Yabein, all speak dialects of the Burmese language. One group, the Hpon, speak a Burmish language closely related to Burmese. Two groups, the Kadu and Ganan, speak more distantly related Sino-Tibetan languages. The last group, the Moken ('Salon' in Burmese), speak an unrelated Austronesian language. The Burmese-speaking Danu and Intha are classified under the Shan 'national race.'

== Geographic distribution ==
=== Myanmar ===
Myanmar's seven regions (in pale yellow) are home to the majority of the Bamar.

The Bamar predominantly live at the confluence of the Irrawaddy, Salween, and Sittaung River valleys in the centre of the country, which roughly encompass the country's seven administrative regions, namely Sagaing, Magwe, Mandalay in Upper Myanmar, as well as Bago, Yangon, Ayeyarwady and Taninthayi Regions in Lower Myanmar. However, the Bamar, particularly labour migrants, are found throughout all 14 of Myanmar's regions and states.

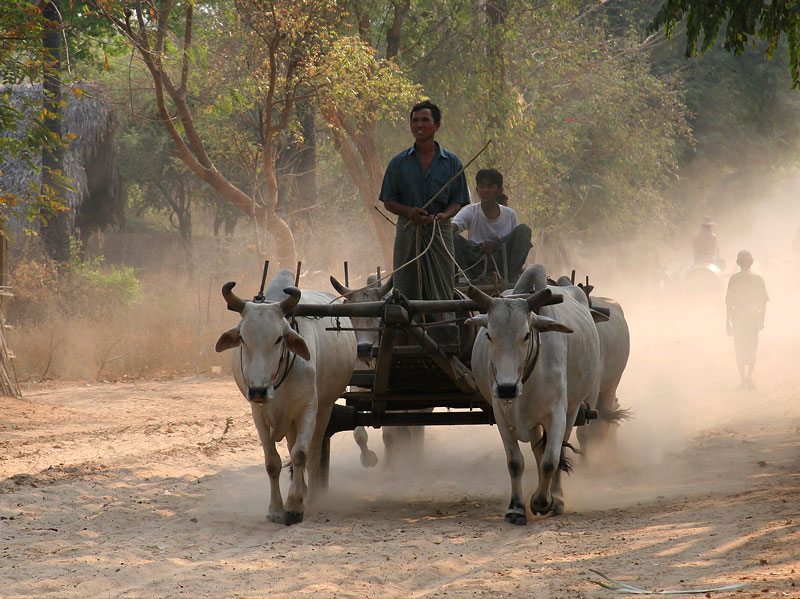
Men on an ox-drawn cart in Bagan, a historic royal capital in the Anya region, the cultural heartland of the Bamar.

The cultural heartland of the Bamar is called Anya (အညာ, lit. 'upstream', also spelt Anyar), which is the area adjoining the upper reaches of the Irrawaddy River, and centred around Sagaing, Magwe, and Mandalay. The Anya region (အညာဒေသ) is often called the 'central dry zone' in English due to its paucity of rainfall and reliance on water irrigation. For 1,100 years, this region was home to a series of Burmese royal capitals, until the British annexed Upper Burma (the last remaining part of the Konbaung Kingdom) in 1885. Bamar from this region are called anyar thar (အညာသား) in Burmese.

In the 1500s, with the expansion of the Toungoo Empire, the Bamar began populating the lower stretches of the Irrawaddy River valley, including Taungoo and Prome (now Pyay), helping to disseminate the Burmese language and Bamar social customs. This influx of migration to historically Mon-speaking regions coincided with the rise of King Tabinshwehti. This pattern of migration intensified during the Konbaung dynasty, particularly among men specialised in wet rice cultivation, as women and children were generally prohibited from emigrating. Following the British annexation of Lower Burma in 1852, millions of Bamar from the Anya region resettled in the sparsely populated Irrawaddy delta between 1858 and 1941. The Bamar were drawn to this 'rice frontier' by the British colonial authorities, who were eager to scale rice cultivation in the colony, and attract skilled Bamar farmers. By the 1890s, the British had established another centre of power and political economy in the Irrawaddy delta.

=== Diaspora ===
The Bamar have emigrated to neighbouring Asian countries as well as Western countries, mirroring the migration patterns of the broader Burmese diaspora. Significant migration began at the start of World War II, and has continued through decades of military rule, economic decline and political instability. Many have settled in Europe, particularly in Great Britain. Following Myanmar's Independence (1948–1962), many Bamar have emigrated to Asian countries like Thailand, Malaysia, Singapore, China, South Korea, Taiwan, and Japan as well as to English-speaking countries like the United States, United Kingdom, Australia, and New Zealand.

== Language ==
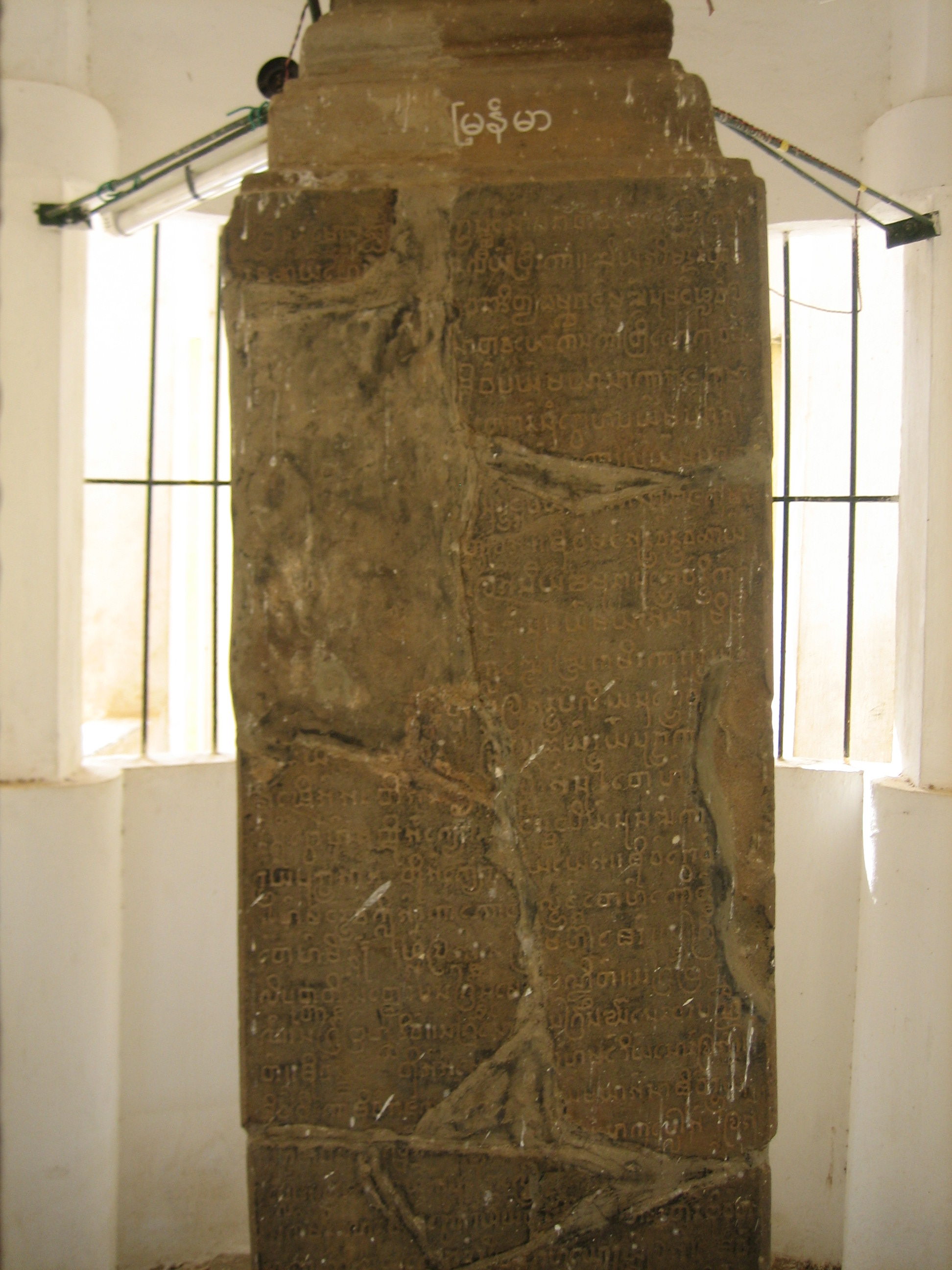
The Myazedi inscription, dated to 1113, is the oldest surviving stone inscription of the Burmese language.

Burmese, a member of the Sino-Tibetan language family, is the native language of the Bamar, and the national language of Myanmar. Burmese is the most widely spoken Tibeto-Burman language, and used as a lingua franca in Myanmar by 97% of the country's population. Burmese is a diglossic language with literary high and spoken low forms. The literary form of Burmese preserves many conservative classical forms and grammatical particles traced back to Old Burmese stone inscriptions, but are no longer used in spoken Burmese.

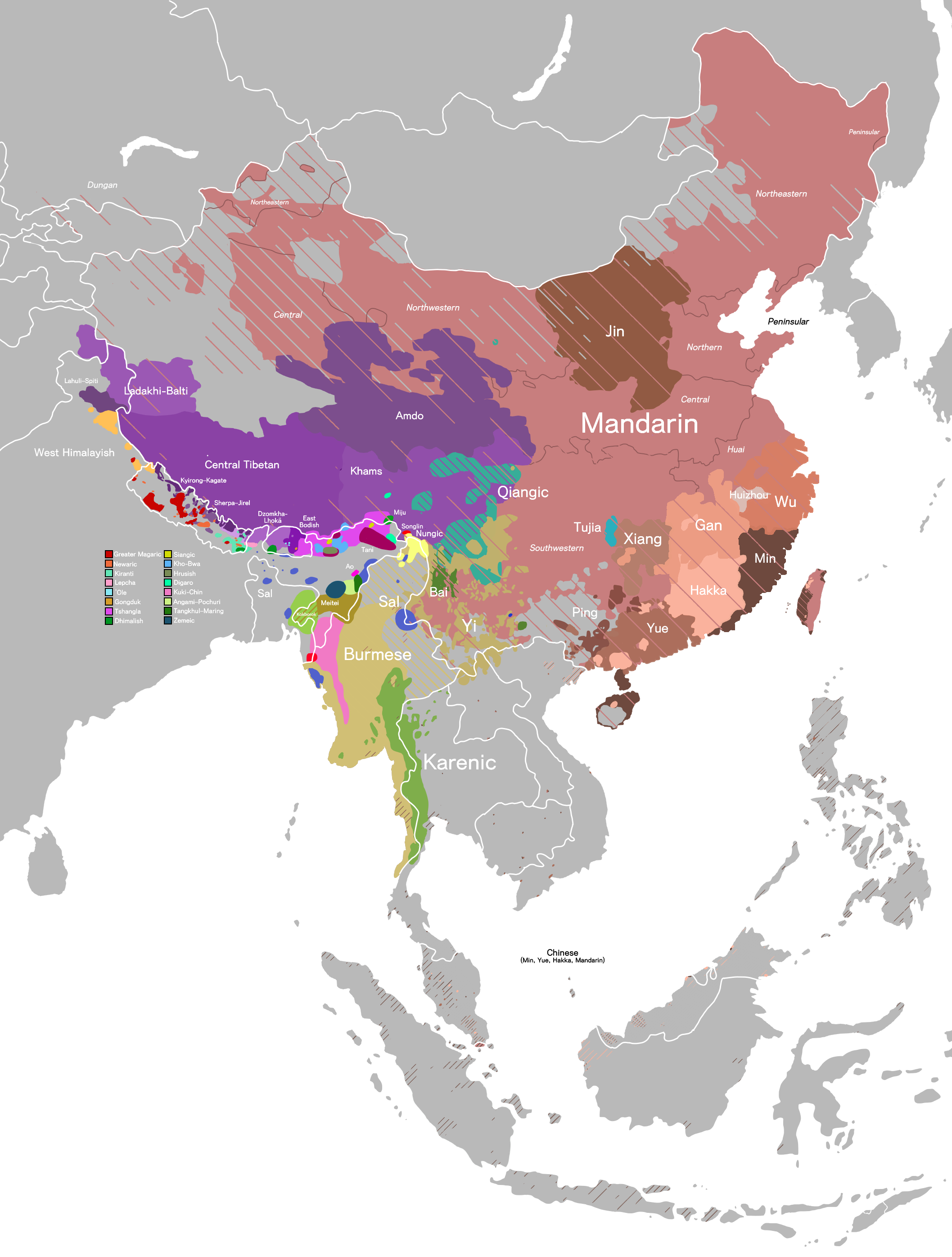
The Map of the distribution of the Sino-Tibetan Languages.

Pali, the liturgical language of Theravada Buddhism, is the primary source of Burmese loanwords. British colonisation also introduced numerous English loanwords to the Burmese lexicon. As a lingua franca, Burmese has been the source and intermediary of loanwords to other Lolo-Burmese languages and major regional languages, including Shan, Kachin, and Mon.

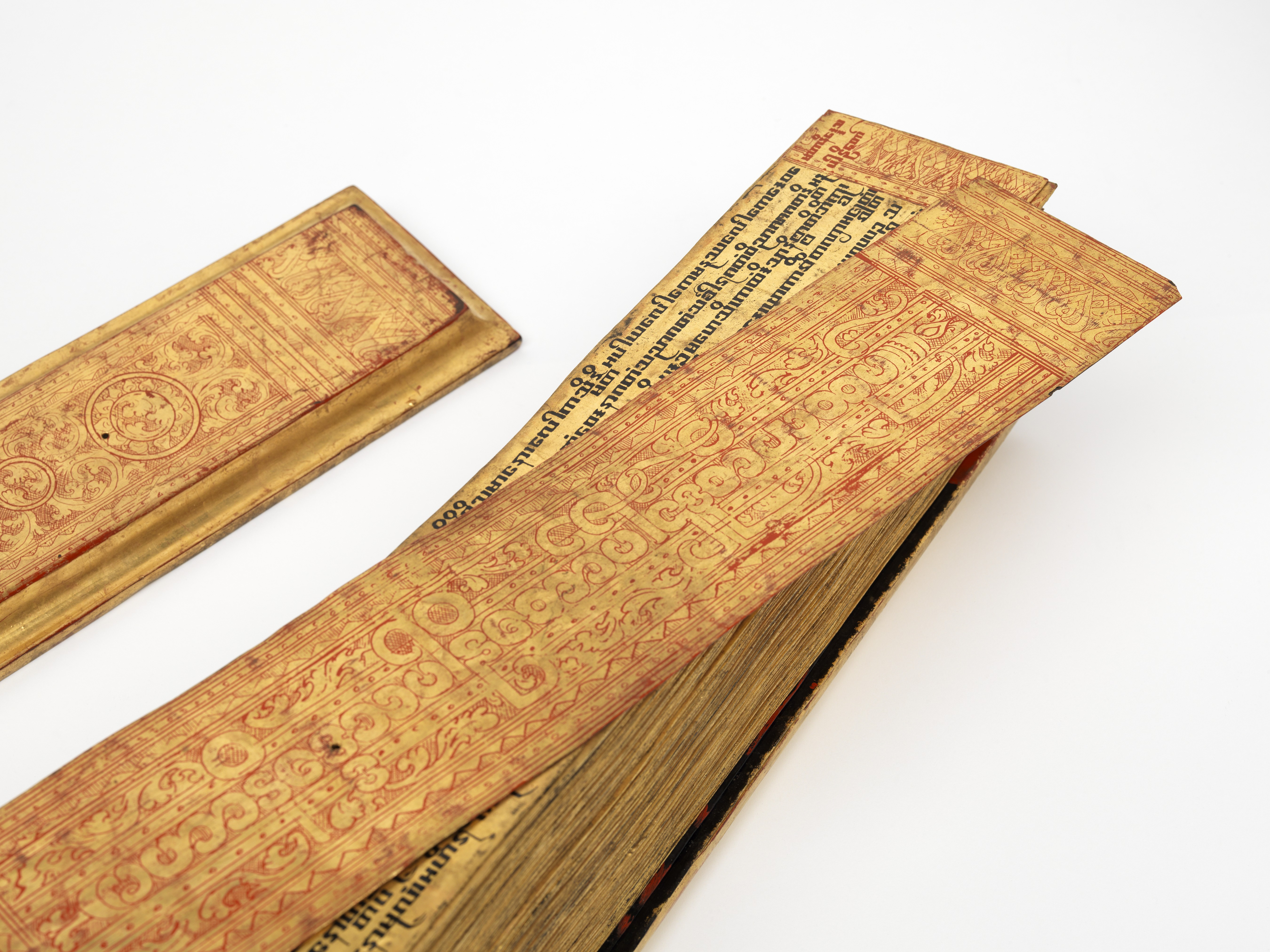
Mahāniddesa, a Buddhist manuscript written in the Burmese script

The Burmese language has a longstanding literary tradition and tradition of widespread literacy. Burmese is the fifth Sino-Tibetan language to develop a writing system, after Chinese, Tibetan, Pyu, and Tangut. The oldest surviving written Burmese document is the Myazedi inscription, which is dated to 1113. The Burmese script is an Indic writing system, and modern Burmese orthography retains features of Old Burmese spellings. The Shan, Ahom, Khamti, Karen, and Palaung scripts are descendants of the Burmese script.

Standard Burmese is based on the language spoken in the urban centres of Yangon and Mandalay, although more distinct Burmese dialects, including Yaw, Dawei (Tavoyan), Myeik, Palaw, Intha-Danu, Arakanese (Rakhine), and Taungyo, emerge in more peripheral and remote areas of the country. These dialects differ from Standard Burmese in pronunciation and lexical choice, not grammar. For instance, Arakanese retains the /ɹ/ sound, which had merged into the /j/ sound in standard Burmese between the 1700s and 1800s (although the former sound is still represented in modern Burmese orthography), while the Dawei and Intha dialects retain a medial /l/ that had disappeared in standard Burmese orthography by the 1100s. The pronunciation distinction is reflected in the word for 'ground,' which is pronounced /mjè/ in standard Burmese, /mɹì/ in Arakanese (both spelt မြေ), and /mlè/ in Dawei (spelt မ္လေ). (Note: Unlike Standard Burmese, Rakhine also merges the /i/ and /e/ vowels.)

== Culture and society ==
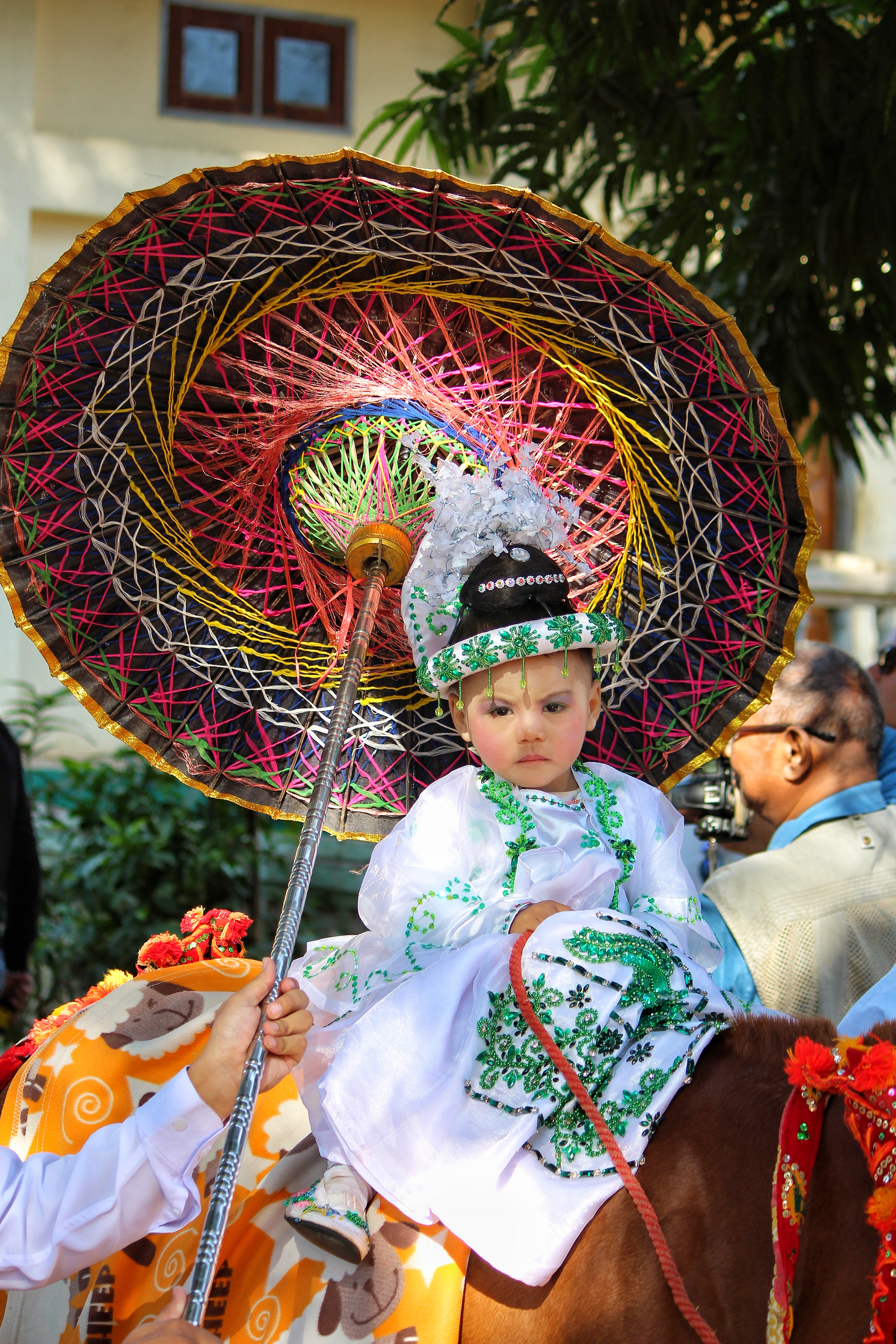
A young boy dressed in royal attire ceremonially re-enacts the Buddha's life, in the shinbyu rite of passage.

Bamar culture, including traditions, literature, cuisine, music, dance, and theatre, has been significantly influenced by Theravada Buddhism and by historical contact and exchange with neighbouring societies, and more recently shaped by Myanmar's colonial and post-colonial history.

A pivotal Bamar societal value is the concept of anade, which is manifested by very strong inhibitions (e.g., hesitation, reluctance, restraint, or avoidance) against asserting oneself in human relations based on the fear that it will offend someone or cause someone to lose face, or become embarrassed, or be of inconvenience. Charity and almsgiving are also central to Bamar society, best exemplified by Myanmar's consistent presence among the world's most generous countries according to the World Giving Index, since rankings were first introduced in 2013.

The Bamar customarily recognise Twelve Auspicious Rites, which are a series of rites of passage. Among these rites, the naming of the child, first feeding, ear-boring for girls, Buddhist ordination (shinbyu) for boys, and wedding rites are the most widely practiced today.

=== Calendar ===
The traditional Burmese calendar is a lunisolar calendar that was widely adopted throughout mainland Southeast Asia, including Siam and Lan Xang, until the late 19th century. Similar to neighbouring Thailand, Laos, and Cambodia, Thingyan, which is held during the month of April, marks the beginning of the Burmese New Year. Several Buddhist full moon days, including the full moon days of Tabaung (for Magha Puja), Kason (for Vesak), Waso (start of the Buddhist lent), Thadingyut (end of the Buddhist lent), and Tazaungmon (start of Kathina), are national holidays. Full moon days also tend to coincide with numerous pagoda festivals, which typically commemorate events in a pagoda's history.

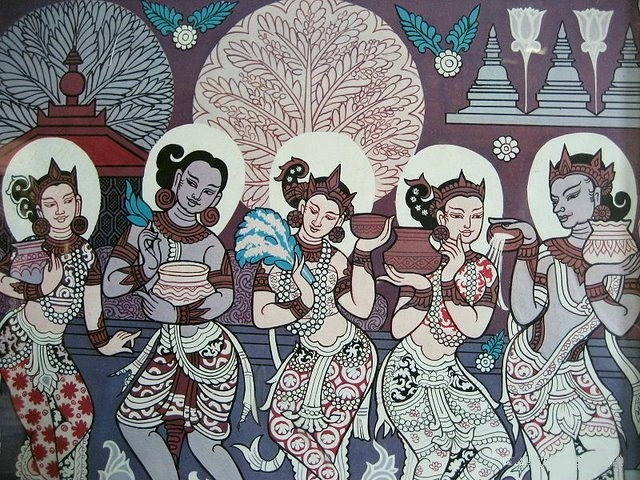
Bagan era mural painting of Thingyan

=== Cuisine ===
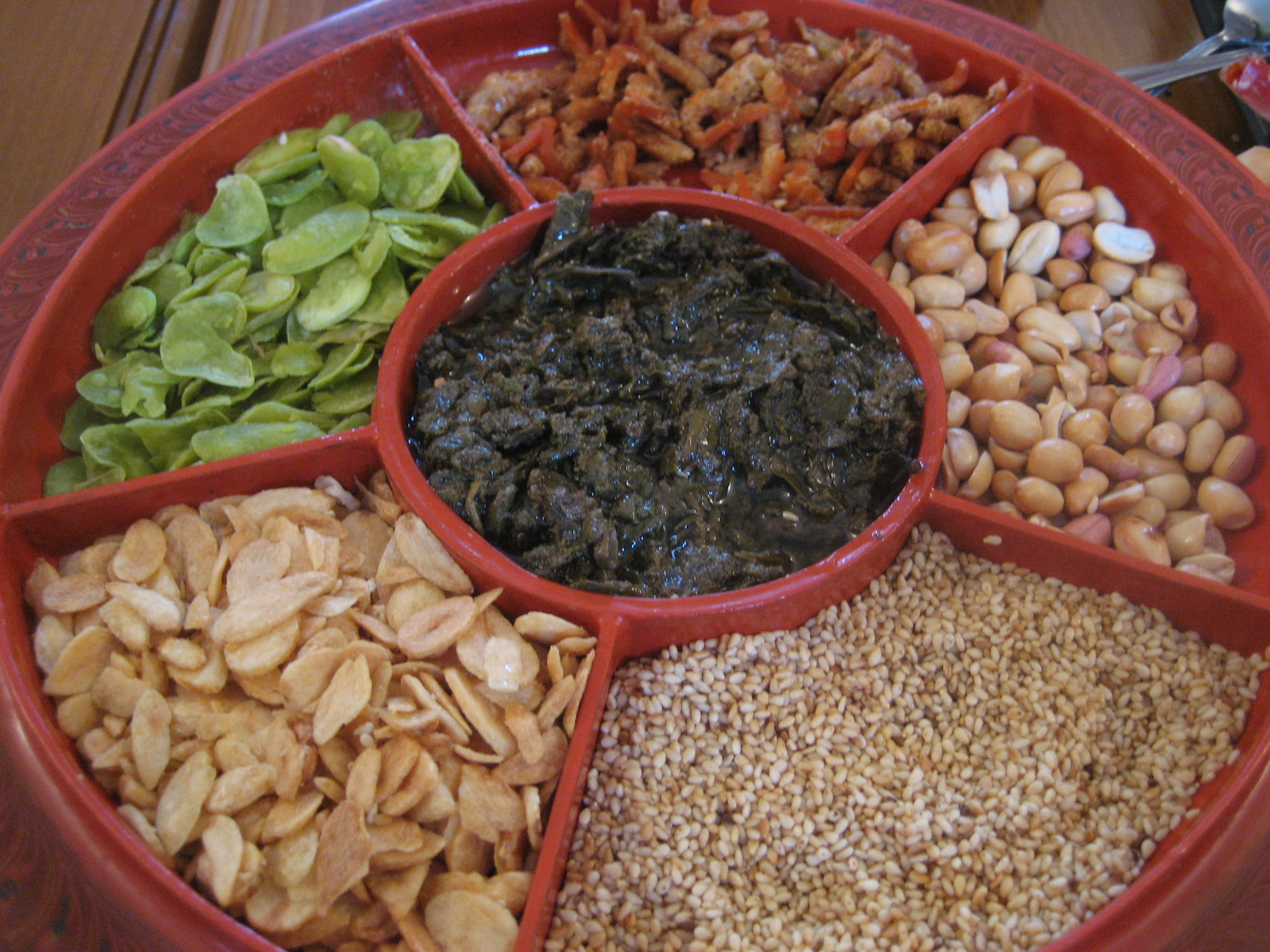
Laphet, served in a traditional lacquer tray called laphet ok.

White rice is the staple of the Bamar diet, reflecting a millennium of continuous rice cultivation in Burmese-speaking areas. Burmese curries, which are made with a curry paste of onions, garlic, ginger, paprika, and turmeric, alongside Burmese salads, soup, cooked vegetables, and ngapi (fermented shrimp or fish paste) traditionally accompany rice for meals. Noodles and Indian breads are also eaten. Bamar cuisine is regional due to differences in the availability of local ingredients. Anya or Upper Burmese cuisine is typified by greater use of land meats (like pork and chicken), beans and pulses, while Lower Burmese cuisine generally incorporates more seafood and fish products like ngapi.

The Bamar traditionally drink green tea, and also eat pickled tea leaves, called lahpet, which plays an important role in ritual culture. Burmese cuisine is also known for its variety of mont, a profuse variety of sweet desserts and savory snacks, including Burmese fritters. The best-known dish of Bamar origin is mohinga, rice noodles in a fish broth. It is available in most parts of the region, also considered as the national dish of Myanmar.

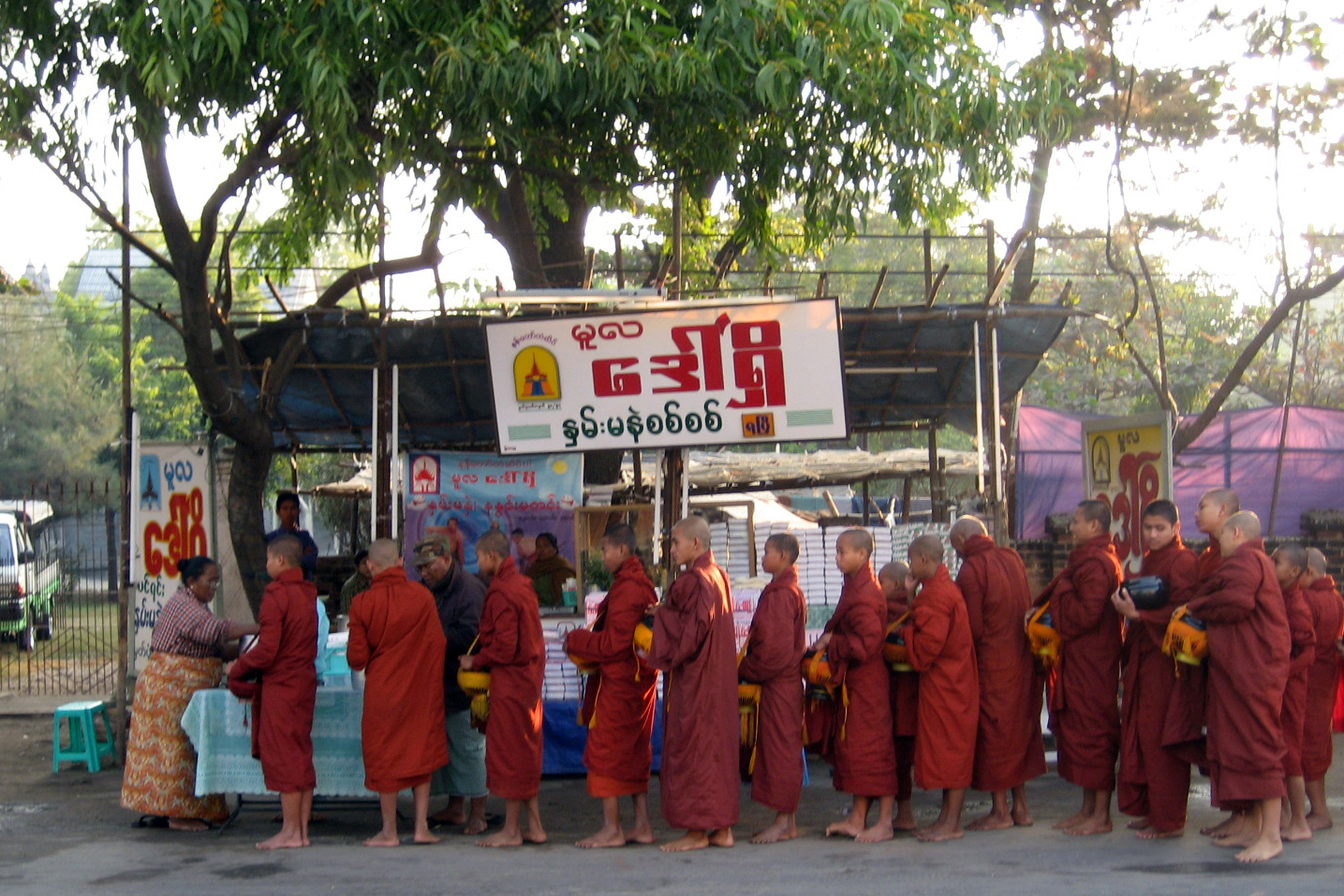
Buddhist monks in Mandalay receive food alms from a htamanè hawker during their daily alms round (ဆွမ်းလောင်းလှည့်).

Burmese cuisine has been significantly enriched by contact and trade with neighboring kingdoms and countries well into modern times. The Columbian exchange in the 15th and 16th centuries introduced key ingredients into the Burmese culinary repertoire, including tomatoes, chili peppers, peanuts, and potatoes. While record-keeping of pre-colonial culinary traditions is scant, food was and remains deeply intertwined with Bamar religious life, exemplified in the giving of food alms (dāna), and communal feasts called satuditha and ahlu pwe (အလှူပွဲ).

=== Literature ===
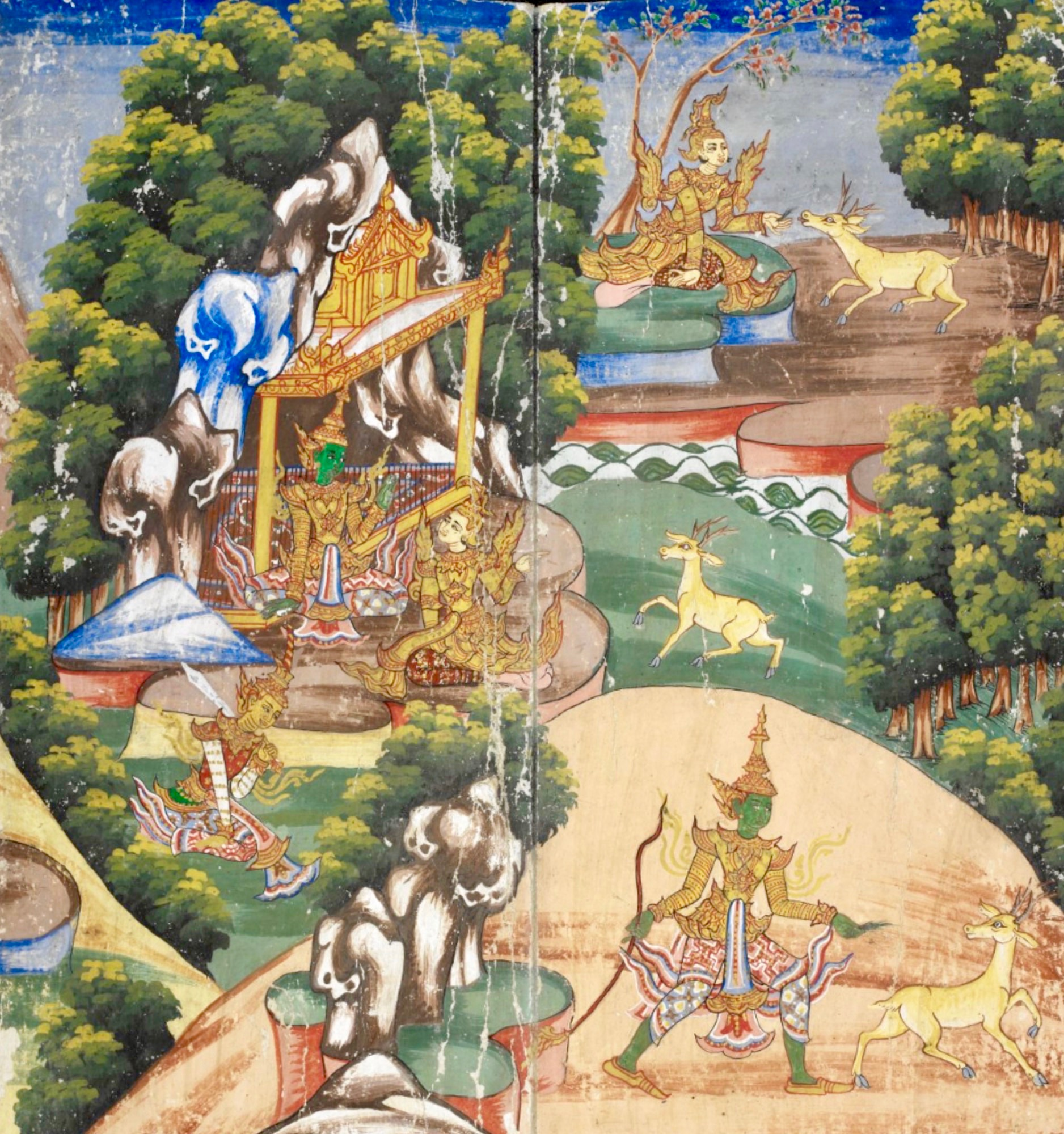
A 19th-century Burmese manuscript depicting a scene from the Ramayana epic.

Burmese literature has a longstanding history, spanning religious and secular genres. Burmese chronicles and historical memoirs called ayedawbon comprise the basis of the Bamar's pre-colonial historical writing traditions.

=== Music ===
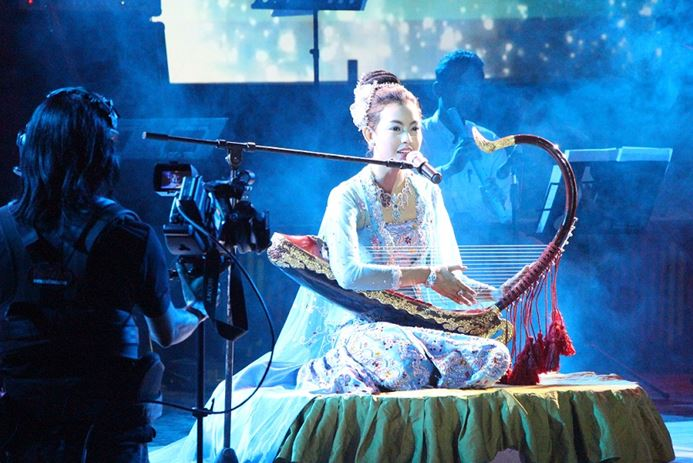
Burmese singer Wyne Lay plays the saung during a musical performance.

Traditional Bamar music is subdivided into folk and classical traditions. Folk music is typically accompanied by the hsaing waing, a musical ensemble featuring a variety of gongs, drums and other instruments, including a drum circle called pat waing, which is the ensemble's centrepiece. Classical music descends from Burmese royal court traditions. The Mahāgīta constitutes the entire corpus of Burmese classical music, which is often accompanied by a small chamber music ensemble that features a distinct set of instruments, such as a harp called saung gauk, bell and clapper, and a xylophone called pattala.

=== Traditional dress ===
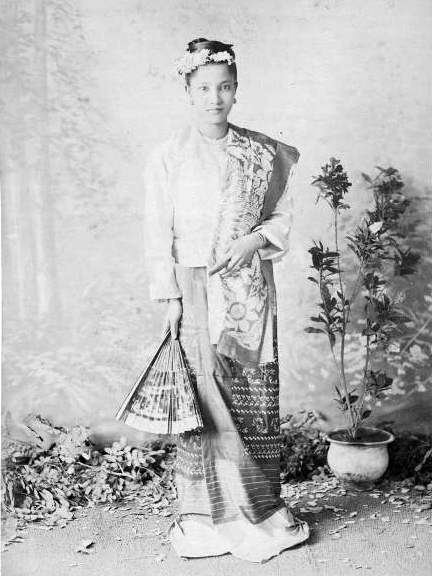
A Mandalay woman dressed in a trailing htamein commonly worn in until the early 20th century.

The Bamar traditionally wear sarongs called longyi, an ankle-length cylindrical skirt that is wrapped at the waist. The modern form of the longyi (လုံချည်) was popularised during the British colonial period, and replaced the much lengthier paso (ပုဆိုး) and htamein (ထဘီ) of the pre-colonial era. The indigenous acheik silk textile, known for its colorful wave-like patterns, is closely associated with the Bamar. Formal attire for men includes a longyi accompanied by a jacket called taikpon (တိုက်ပုံ), which similar to the Manchu magua, and a cloth turban called gaung baung (ခေါင်းပေါင်း). Velvet sandals called gadiba phanat (ကတ္တီပါဖိနပ်‌, also called Mandalay phanat), are worn as formal footwear by both men and women.

Bamar people of both sexes and all ages also apply thanakha, a paste ground from the fragrant wood of select tree species, on their skin, especially on their faces. In modern times, the practice is now largely confined to women, children, and young, unmarried men. The use of thanakha is not unique to the Bamar; many other Burmese ethnic groups also utilize this cosmetic. Western makeup and cosmetics have long enjoyed a popularity in urban areas.

=== Personal names ===
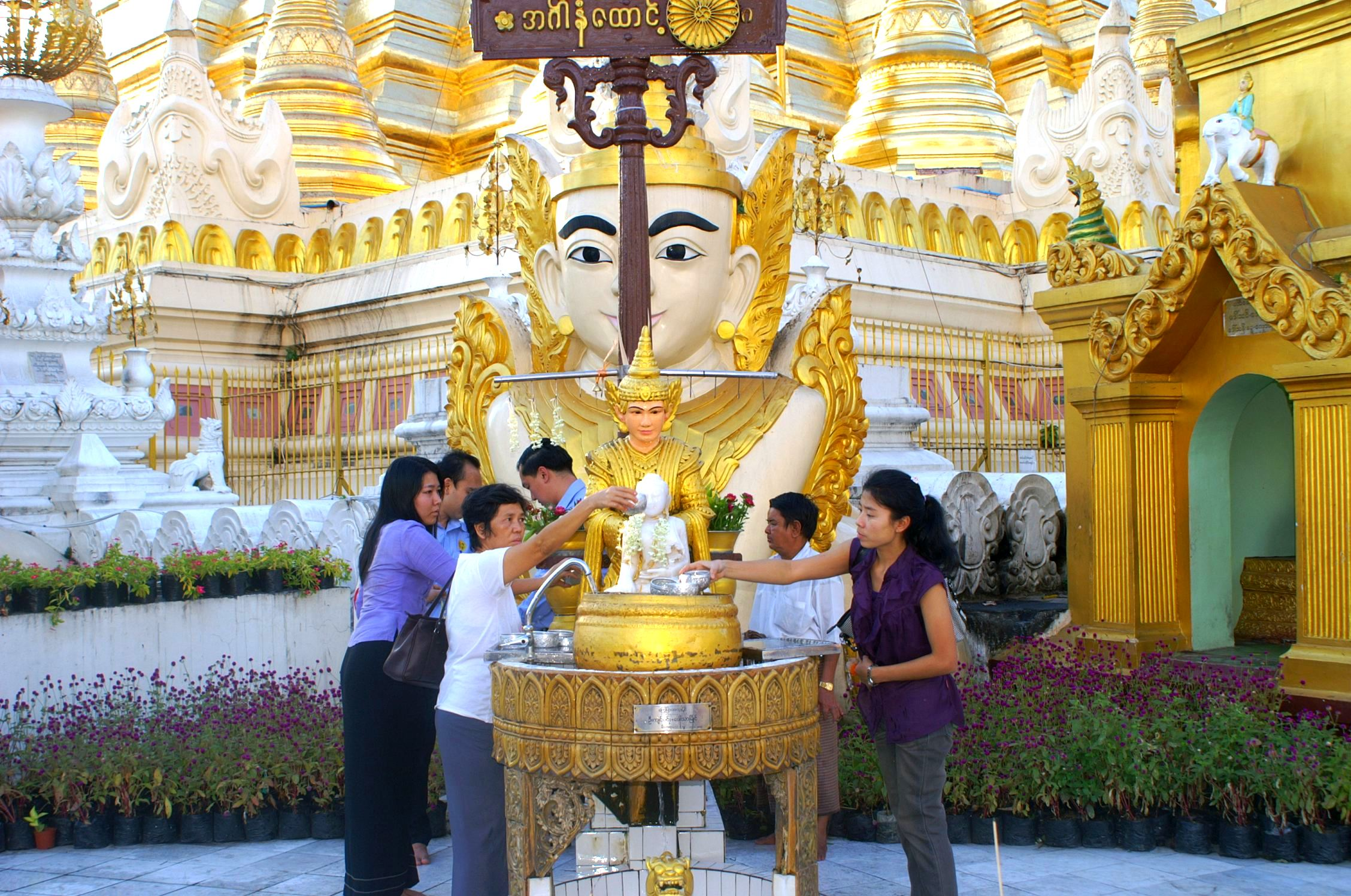
The Tuesday planetary post at Shwedagon Pagoda, which is customarily visited by Tuesday-born devotees.

The Bamar possess a single personal name and do not have family names or surnames. Burmese names typically incorporate a mix of native and Pali words that symbolise positive virtues, with female names tending to signify beauty, flora, and family values, and male names connoting strength, bravery, and success. Personal names are prefixed with honorifics based on one's relative gender, age, and social status. For instance, a Bamar male will advance from the honorific of "Maung" to "Ko" as he approaches middle adulthood, and from "Ko" to "U' as he approaches old age.

A common Bamar naming scheme uses a child's day of birth to assign the first letter of their name, reflecting the importance of one's day of birth in Burmese astrology. The traditional Burmese calendar includes Yahu, which is Wednesday afternoon.

Day of birth	Letters
Monday (တနင်္လာ)	က (ka), ခ (kha), ဂ (ga), ဃ (gha), င (nga)
Tuesday (အင်္ဂါ)	စ (sa), ဆ (hsa), ဇ (za), ဈ (za), ည (nya)
Wednesday (ဗုဒ္ဓဟူး)	လ (la), ဝ (wa)
Yahu (ရာဟု)	ယ (ya), ရ (ya, ra)
Thursday (ကြာသပတေး)	ပ (pa), ဖ (hpa), ဗ (ba), ဘ (ba), မ (ma)
Friday (သောကြာ)	သ (tha), ဟ (ha)
Saturday (စနေ)	တ (ta), ထ (hta), ဒ (da), ဓ (da), န (na)
Sunday (တနင်္ဂနွေ)	အ (a)

== Religion ==
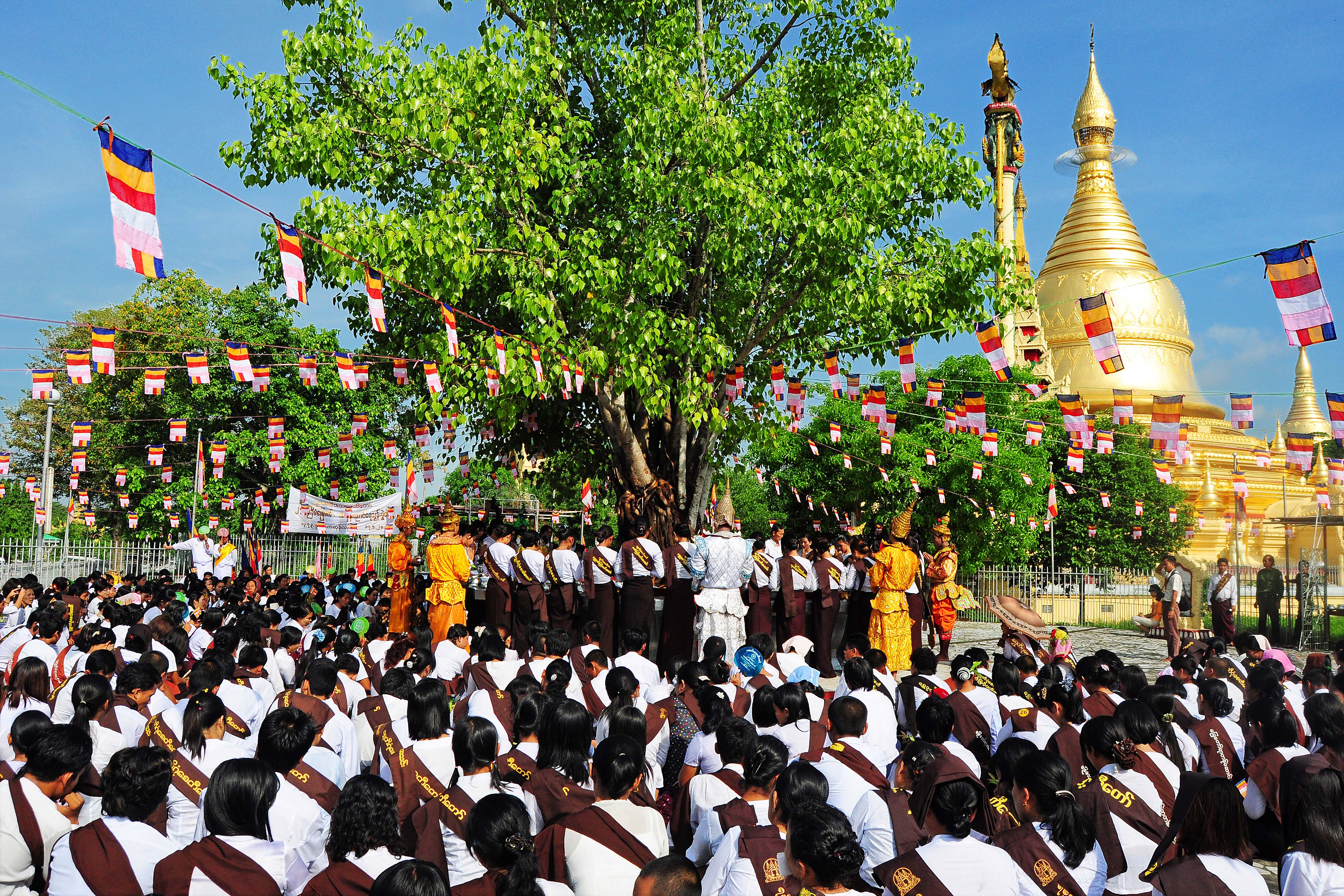
Buddhist devotees converge on a Bodhi tree in preparation for watering, a traditional activity during the Full Moon Day of Kason.

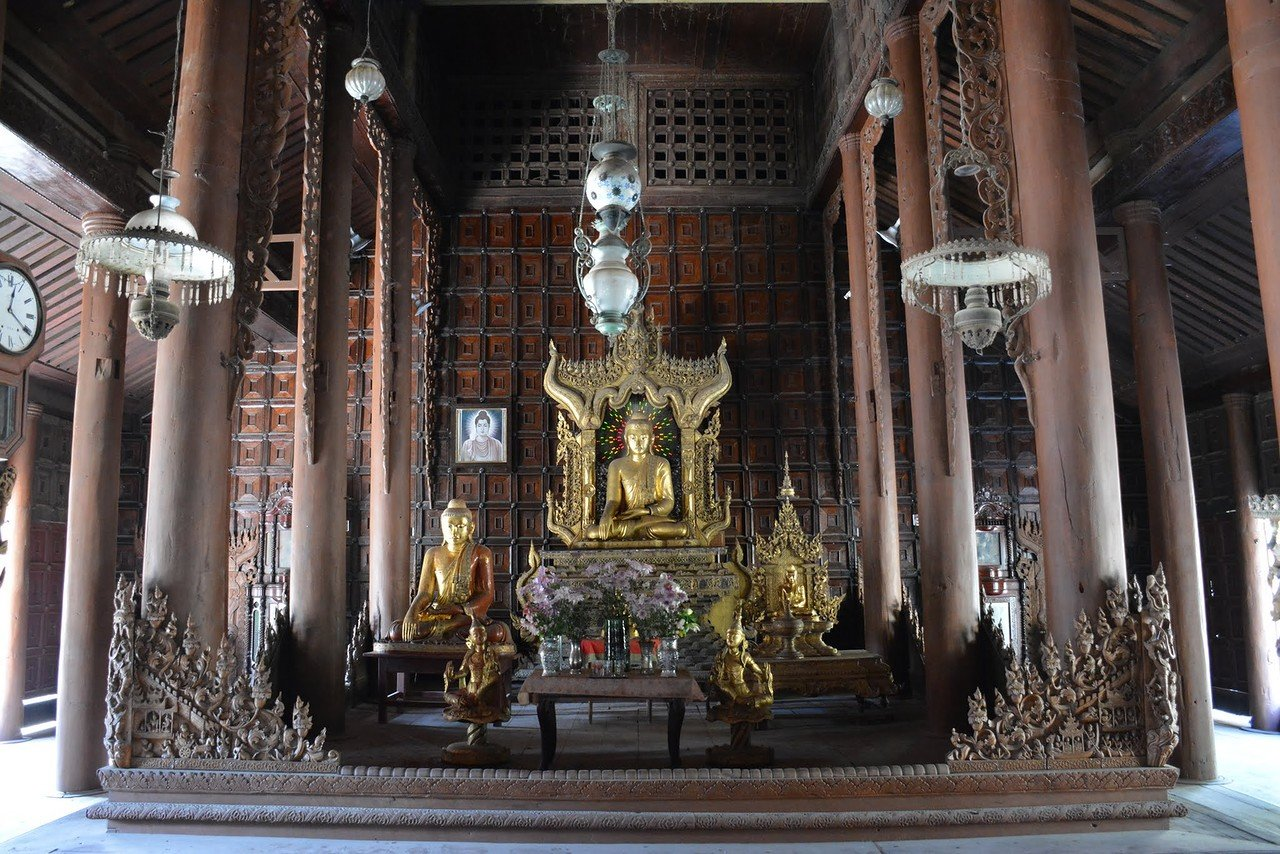
Altar in Shwenandaw Monastery Mandalay

The Bamar predominantly embrace a syncretic blend of Theravada Buddhism and indigenous Burmese folk religion, the latter of which involves the recognition and veneration of spirits called nat, and pre-dates the introduction of Theravada Buddhism. These two faiths play an important role in Bamar cultural life.

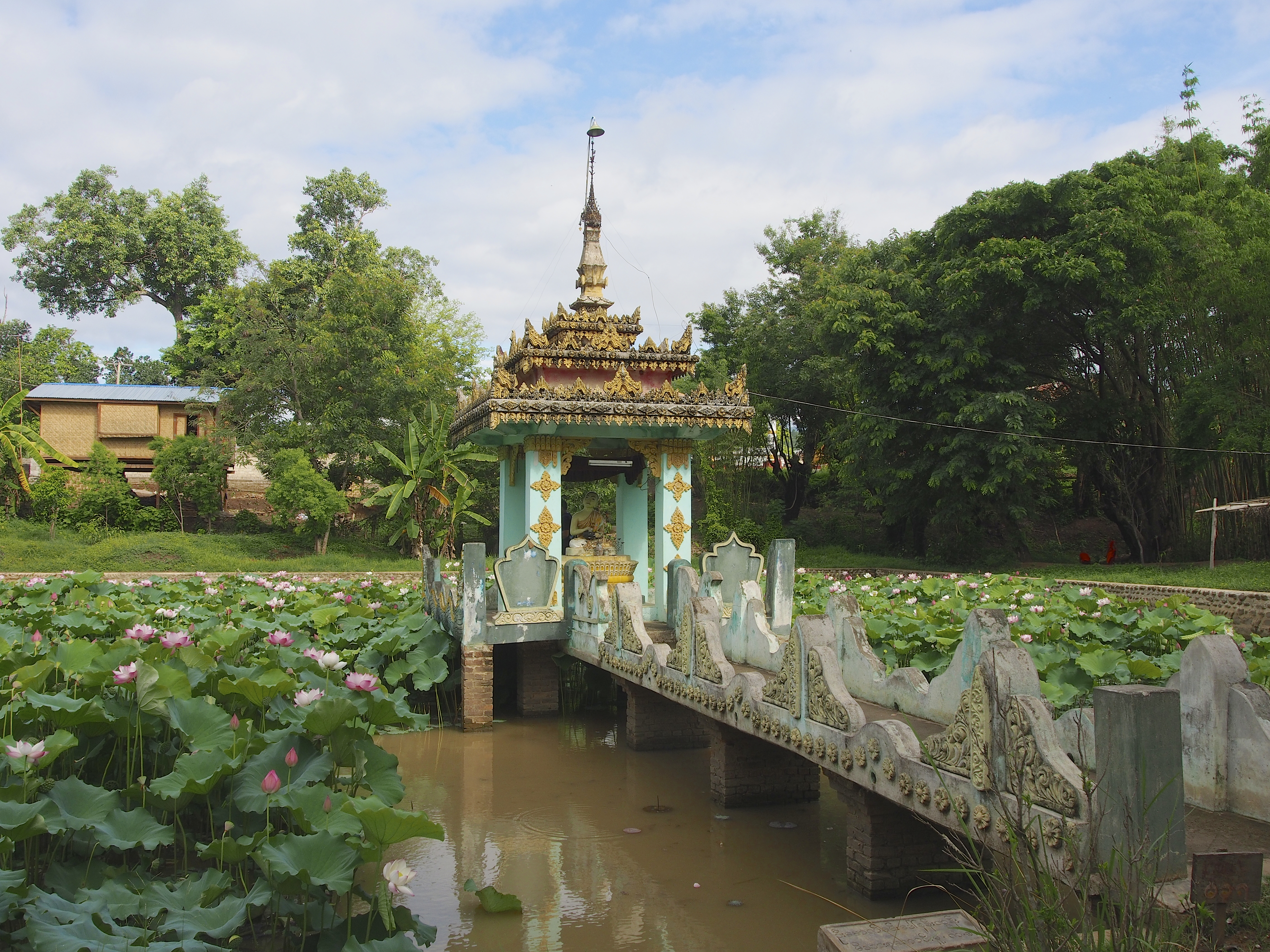
A shrine of Shin Upagutta in Hsipaw, Shan State.

Theravada Buddhism is closely intertwined with Bamar identity, having been the predominant faith among Burmese speakers since the 11th century, during the Pagan dynasty. Modern-day Bamar Buddhism is typified by the observance of basic five precepts and the practice of dāna (charity), sīla (Buddhist ethics) and bhavana (meditation). Village life is centred at Buddhist monasteries called kyaung, which serve as community centres and address the community's spiritual needs. Buddhist Sabbath days called Uposatha, which follow the moon's phases (i.e., new, waxing, full, waning), are observed by more devout Buddhists.

Vestiges of Mahayana Buddhism remain popular among the Bamar, including the veneration of Shin Upagutta, Shin Thiwali, and Lawkanat (the Burmese name for Avalokiteśvara), while the influence of Hinduism can be seen in the widespread veneration of Hindu deities like Thuyathadi (the Burmese name for Saraswati) and practice of yadaya rituals. Smaller communities practice more esoteric forms of Buddhism, including weizza practices.

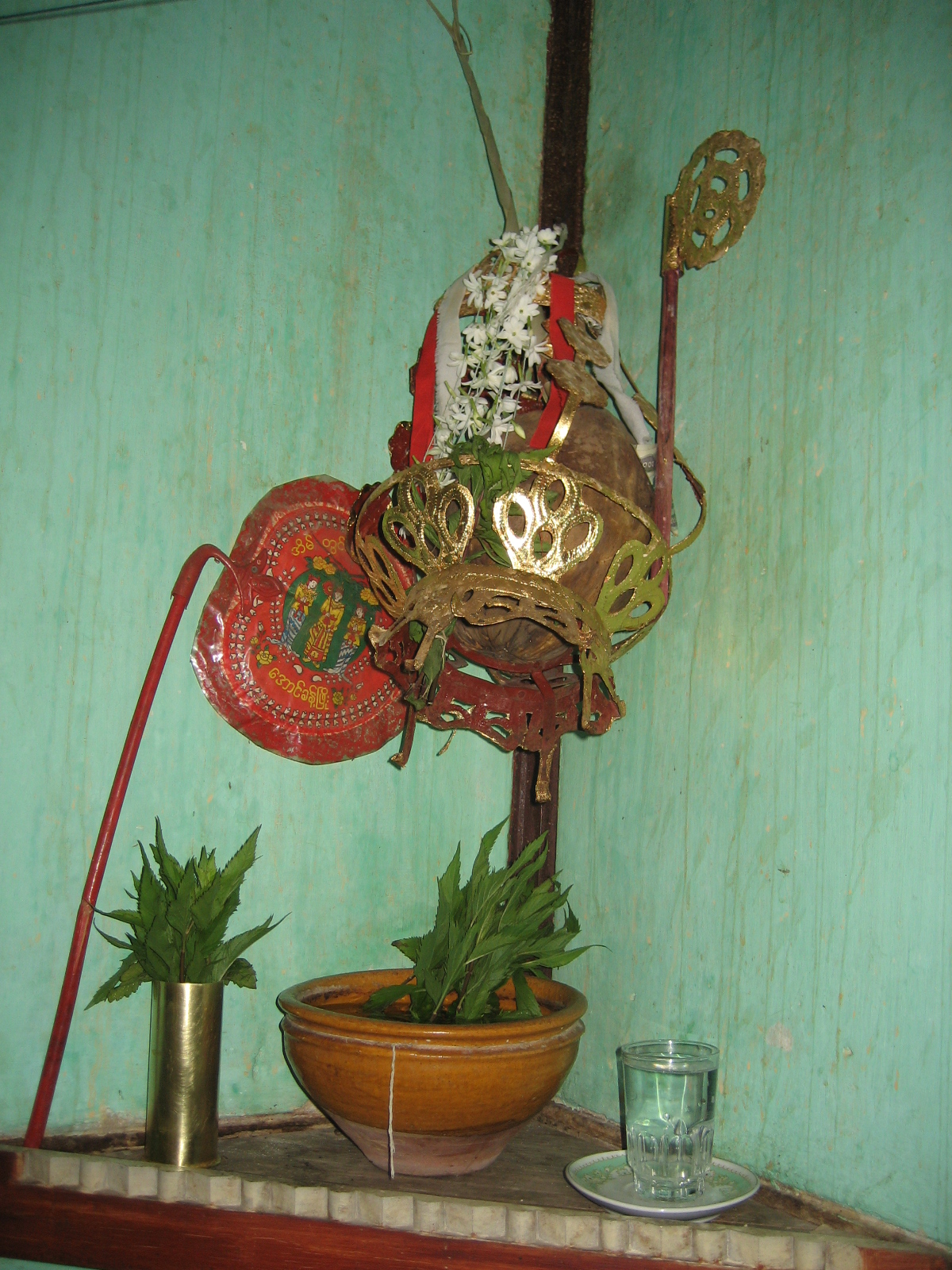
A coconut, called on-daw, is traditionally hung on the southwest post in a house, symbolising the household guardian nat.

The Bamar also profess a belief in guardian nats, particularly the veneration of Mahagiri, the household guardian nat. Bamar households traditionally maintain a shrine, which holds a long-stemmed coconut called on-daw (အုန်းတော်), symbolic of Mahagiri. The shrine is traditionally placed at the home's main southwest pillar (called yotaing or ရိုးတိုင်). The expression of Burmese folk religion is very localised; the Bamar in Upper Myanmar and urban areas tend to propitiate the Thirty-Seven Min, a pantheon of nats who are intimately linked to the pre-colonial royal court. Meanwhile, the Bamar in Lower Myanmar tend to propitiate other local or guardian nats like Bago Medaw and U Shin Gyi. Spirit houses called nat ein (နတ်အိမ်‌) or nat sin (နတ်စင်‌) are commonly found in Bamar areas.

A minority of Bamar practice other religions, including Islam and Christianity. Among them, Bamar Muslims (previously known as Zerbadees or Pati), are the descendants of interracial marriages between Indian Muslims and Bamar Buddhists, who self-identify as Bamar. (Note: The term Zerbadee was first used in the 1891 Burma Census, and may derive from the Persian phrase zer bad, which means 'below the wind' or 'land of the east.')

== See also ==
- Awgatha
- Burmese mythology
- Burmese pagoda
- Culture of Myanmar
- Demographics of Myanmar

== Bibliography ==
- Gordon, Raymond G. Jr. (2005). "Language Family Trees". Ethnologue: Languages of the World, Fifteenth edition. SIL International.
- Khin Myo Chit (1980). Flowers and Festivals Round the Burmese Year.
- Scott, James George (1882). The Burman: His Life and Notions. London: Macmillan.
- Myint-U, Thant (2006). The River of Lost Footsteps—Histories of Burma. Farrar, Straus and Giroux. ISBN 978-0-374-16342-6.
- Tsaya (1886). Myam-Ma, The Home of the Burman. Calcutta: Thacker, Spink and Co. pp. 36–37. Archived from the original on 13 June 2020.
