= Bago Medaw =

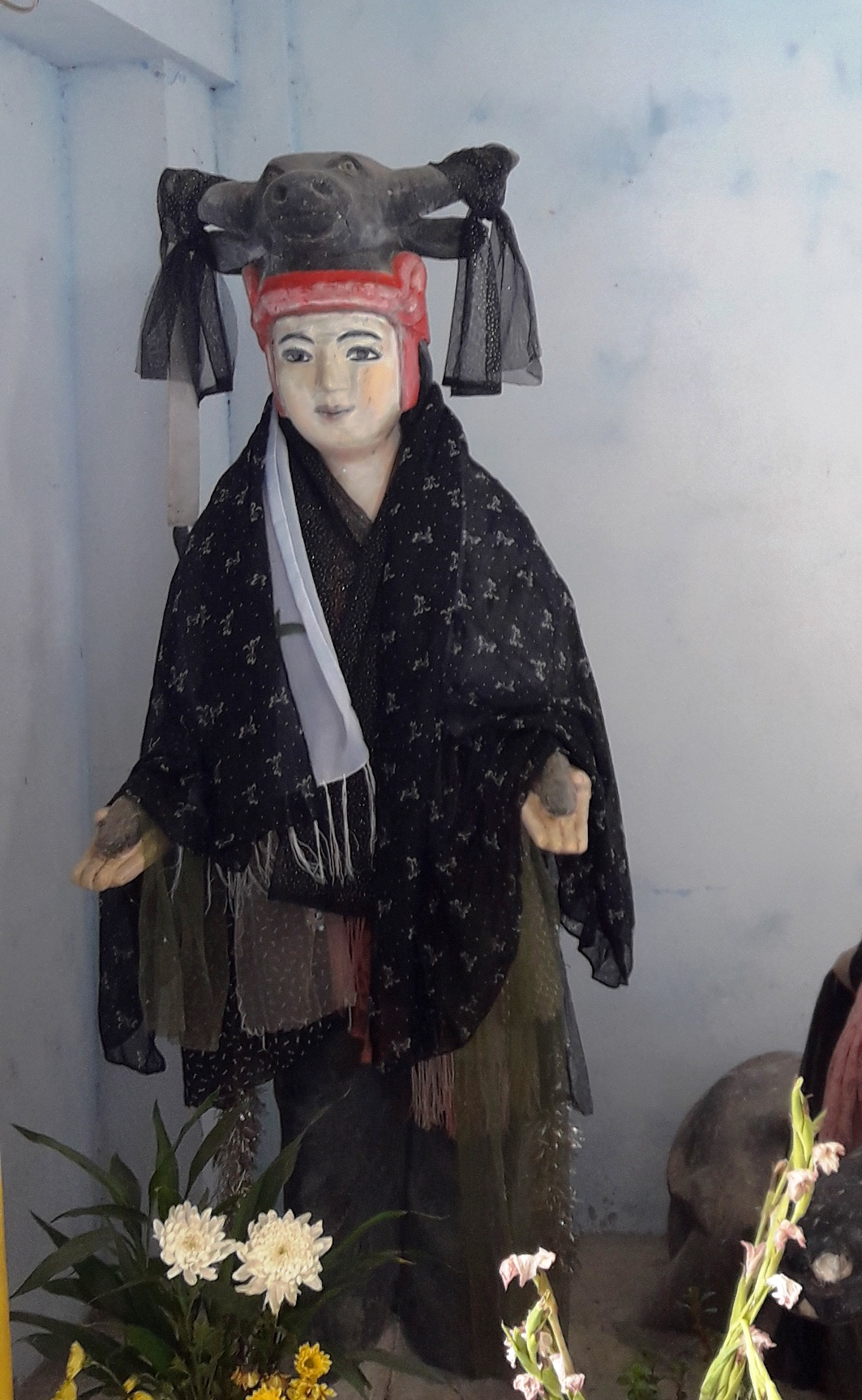
Bago Medaw also known as the Buffalo Mother or Lady Buffalo

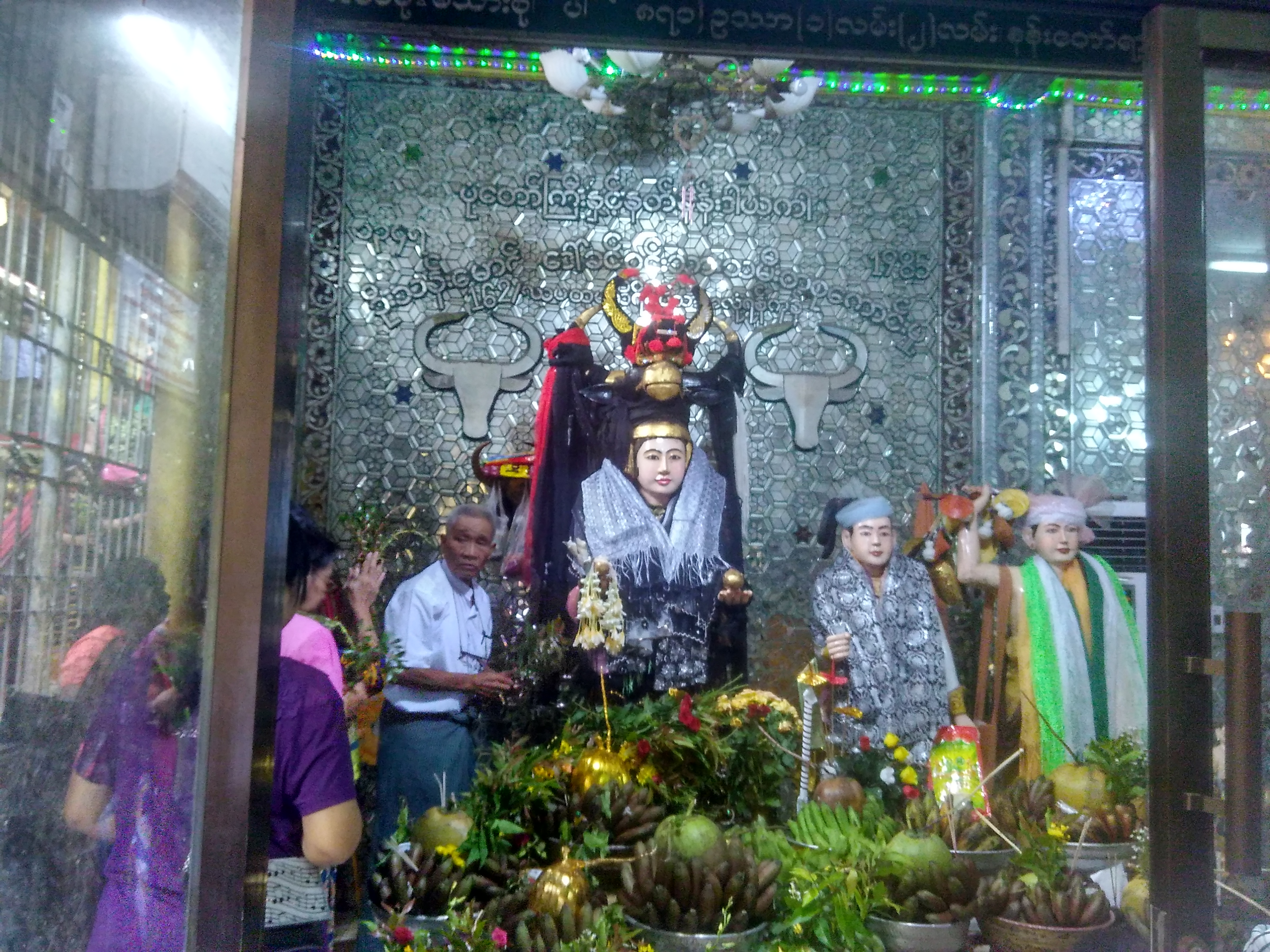
A shrine of Bago Medaw at Hintha Gon Pagoda in Bago.

Bago Medaw (also known as the Buffalo Mother or Lady Buffalo; Burmese: ပဲခူးမယ်တော်, IPA: [bəɡó mɛ̀dɔ̀] or Nakkarai Medaw နံကရိုင်းမယ်တော်, IPA: [nàɰ̃kəɹáiɰ̃ mɛ̀dɔ̀]) is a Burmese nat commonly venerated in the vicinity of Bago (although worship is seen throughout Lower Burma). Bago Medaw is depicted as a maiden wearing a water buffalo skull, representing a female water buffalo named Nakkarai (Burmese: နံကရိုင်း), who nursed Prince Ashakuma, the son of Thamala, the traditional founder of Hanthawaddy (now Bago). She is believed to protect the family and home, and grant wishes to those she favors.

She is believed to be a goddess of the Mon people, representing the Mon cultural identity and the history of Bago, which was once the Mon capital of Hanthawaddy. In Mon People Call Her Name “Minangkarai (Mon: မိနံကရိုင်)”

== Legend ==
In the year 187, King Thamala reigned over Hanthawaddy. He appointed his brother, Prince Wimala, as the crown prince, sending him to Taxila for studies. The king promised that Wimala would succeed the throne upon his return. Simultaneously, King Thamala selected a woman, reportedly born inside a glowing pumpkin in the Hanthawaddy forest, to be the chief queen with the title of "pumpkin maiden." This queen later gave birth to a son named Prince Ashakuma.

When the crown prince returned to the country after his studies, the king neglected his promise. Consequently, the crown prince became furious and killed his older brother, seizing control of the throne. In the wake of his uncle's usurpation, young Prince Ashakuma was forced into exile. Nursed by the female water buffalo named Nakkarai, the young prince considered Nakkarai as his mother.

Upon Prince Ashakuma obstructing the tide of the water goddess Manimekhala, her anger flared, compelling him to make a wager. In a decree, the prince was mandated to cut thousands of gazelles' tails within 1 hour to appease her wrath. The rule specified that the loser must unquestioningly obey the winner.

Despite the prince cutting thousands of gazelles' tails in the meantime, the goddess cunningly concealed one tail behind her back to deceive him. Following his defeat by the goddess' trickery, she demanded that he cut off the head of Nakkarai, who had pure gold in her horn, and present it to her. After hearing that news, concerned that her son might commit a grave sin by beheading her, Mother Nakkarai ordered him to place the blade only on her neck. She made a solemn vow to heaven to cut her head automatically. Since then, Nakkarai became a nat (deity), and people began constructing shrines for her in almost every front yard. She governed through her own shrine, ensuring that business growth served the well-being of the people.
