= Hintha Gon Pagoda =

Buddhist shrine in Bago, Myanmar

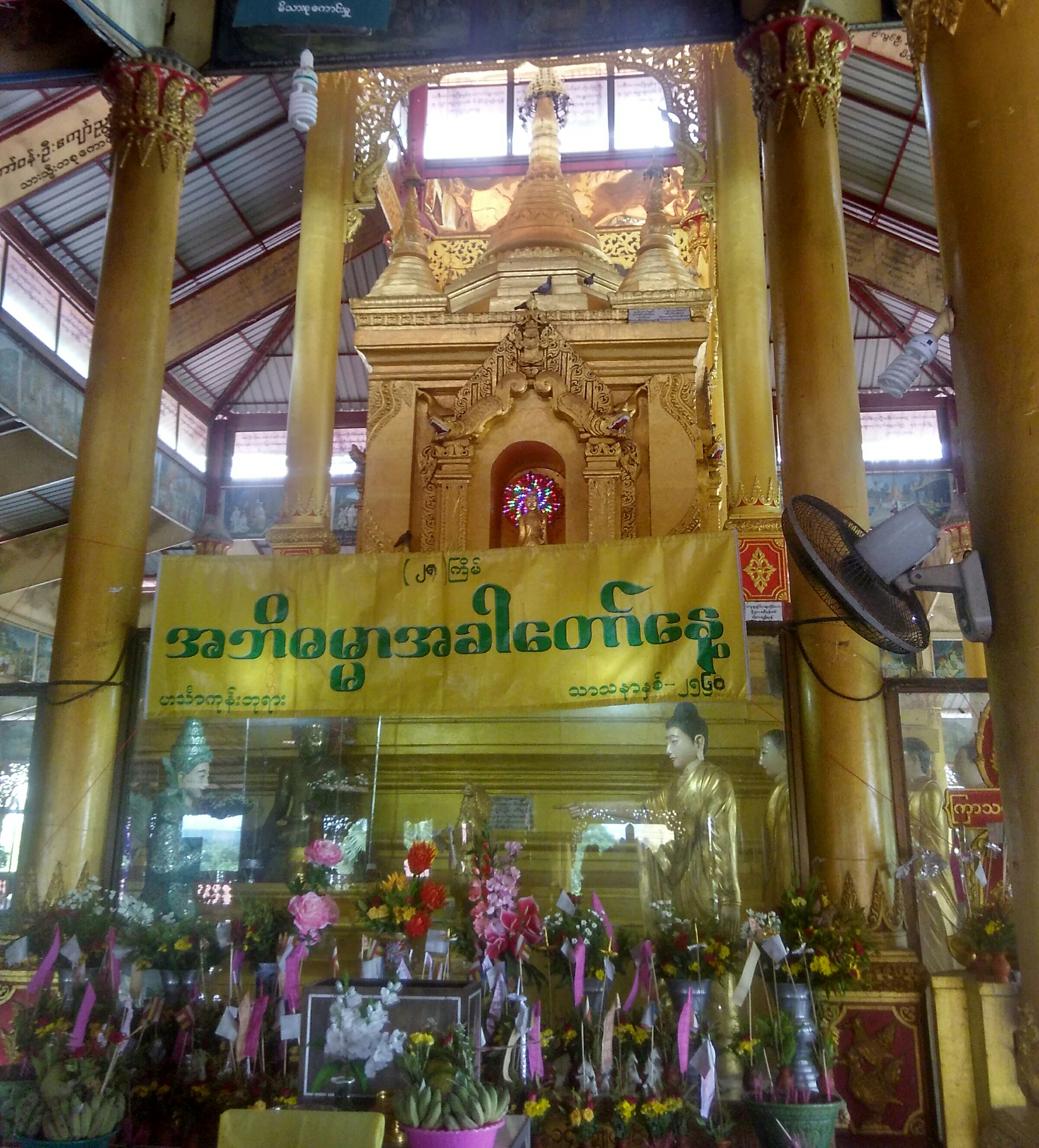

- Location within Myanmar

Religion
- Affiliation: Buddhism

Location
- Location: Bago
- Country: Myanmar
- Coordinates: 17.3368°N 96.5050°E

The Hintha Gon Pagoda (Burmese: ဟင်္သာကုန်းဘုရား) is a major Buddhist shrine located in Bago, in the Bago Region of Myanmar. It is a popular tourist destination, named after the legendary Hintha bird, a symbol of the Mon people.

The pagoda is situated on a hill that, according to Burmese legend, was once an island in the sea. When sea levels rose, it was said to be the only place where the mythical Hintha bird could land. The site features paintings and sculptures of the Hintha bird, often depicted in pairs.

According to geologist Dr. Nyi Nyi, the hill known as Hintha Kone likely emerged as an island under the sea about 15 million years ago. This geological formation, combined with local legend, gave rise to its symbolic association with the Hinthas. The symbol of Bago features two Hintha birds resting, referencing this myth.

The area is believed to have been an early settlement site for the Mon people, originally from the Utsala region of India. The word "Wanpe" means "Hintha" in the Mon language, giving rise to the name "Hintha" (or Hanthawaddy). The hill was also known as "Hintha Kyun" (Hintha Island) or "Hintha Kone" (Hintha Hill). Historically, the first "Hintha Kyun" was located near the former Bago Police Station, which includes high ground to the north and south.

According to Buddhist legend, Gautama Buddha stayed in the area at a place called Suttasala. The Mahasala merchant brothers were told:

After the Buddha’s passing away, after thirteen hundred years of the Dhamma, King Sindrakham will take two Mon brothers, Samalakumma and Vimalakumma, to the east of the Sudassana mountain where this Dhamma is now being presented to you, and build a new city and a new palace, and erect a monument called the Land of Hansavadi. Samalakumma will be the first king. He will believe in the Buddha’s Dhamma and be its protector.

King Samalakumma is said to have ascended the throne on the full moon day of Tabaung in the Dhamma year 1369 (Burmese Era 187) and built a city as prophesied. His successor, King Samalamon, constructed the Kyatthuvannahamsa Pagoda in honor of Brahma and the deities.

Later, Rathe Gyi U Khanti, a well-known monk and builder of religious sites, restored the Kyatthuvannahamsa Pagoda and renamed it Hinthagone Pagoda. The words "Kyat" and "Kat" are derived from local terms referencing the Buddha and Hintha, respectively.

In the year 1286 of the Burmese calendar (1923 CE), U Khanti built his own version of the Hinthagone Pagoda on the hill where the older pagoda stood. He famously connected it to the Shwe Maw Daw Pagoda using a large iron cable, remnants of which are still visible today. The cables and rooftops were damaged in the bombing by Japanese warplanes during World War II, and were not restored until the year 1351 ME.

To the east of the hill, visitors can view the towering Shwe Maw Daw Pagoda, the tallest pagoda in Myanmar, making the Hintha Gon Pagoda a notable viewpoint in the city.
